= Vox AC15 =

Guitar amplifier made by Vox

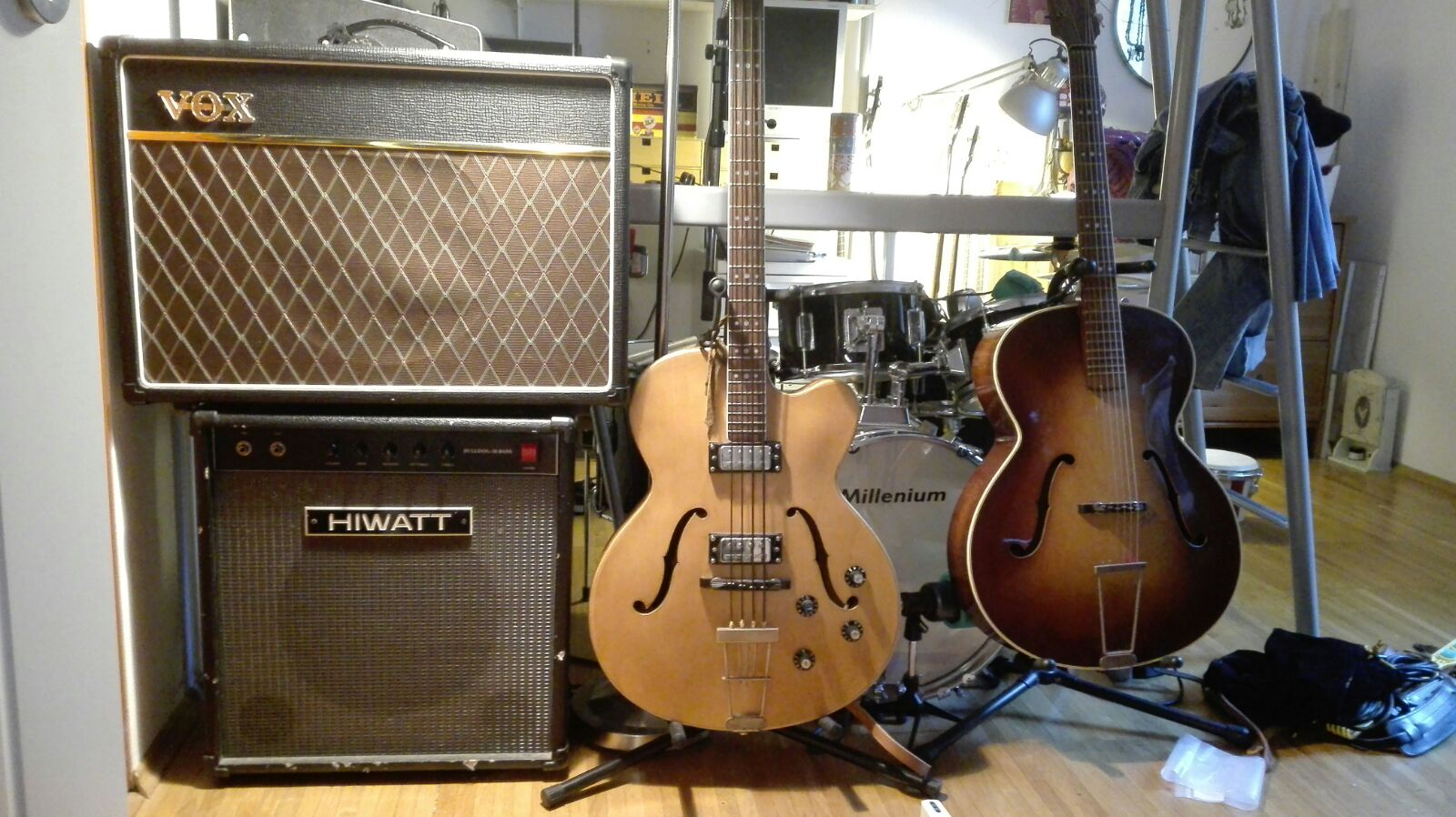
A Vox AC15 (top left)

The Vox AC15 is the first guitar amplifier produced by the British brand Vox. Vox founder Tom Jennings wished to capitalize on the growing popularity of rock and roll and debuted his amplifier in 1958 as an alternative to imported Fender offerings, which were subject to a trade embargo at the time. Utilizing an EL84-based power section, the AC15's tone was characteristically "glassy, chimey, and sweetly compressed when [over]driven" and helped define the sound of early British rock with influential adopters like Hank Marvin of the Shadows and subsequently many artists of the British Invasion. To meet the demands of players looking for more volume, Vox released the higher-wattage AC30 in 1959 and the AC15 was discontinued in 1964. The AC30, however, was redesigned shortly after its introduction, leaving the AC15 with its own unique sonic character that many guitarists prefer. Vox has since released multiple reissues of the AC15.

== History ==
=== Development ===
In the 1950s, accordion-player Tom Jennings founded Jennings Musical Industries (JMI), which produced multiple instrument amplifiers but none intended for electric guitar. At the time, rock and roll's popularity was spreading from the United States to the United Kingdom, but Fender's successful line of guitar amplifiers were subject to a trade embargo and therefore difficult—and expensive—to acquire. They additionally required a step-up converter to run on the U.K.'s 220V power grid. With these issues, Jennings saw an opening for an affordable amplifier for the U.K. market and its growing music scene and recruited his friend and engineer Dick Denney to design it. Denney had tried and failed to market his own amplifier designs, but in 1957 accepted an offer from JMI to bring Jennings' vision to fruition. Whereas amps from manufacturers like Fender and Gibson were largely designs adapted from handbooks distributed by valve manufacturers, Denney's new circuit was entirely his own creation and designed specifically to work with the natural tones of an electric guitar.

This new amplifier would be named the Vox AC1/15, which was later shortened to Vox AC15. The name referenced the fact that it ran on AC power rather than noisier DC power ("AC"); that it was the first Vox model designed for guitar ("1/"); and that it was 15 watts ("15"), which made it comparatively powerful for the time. The AC15 went on to become a significant success for JMI/Vox thanks to its widespread use by British players.

=== Design ===
==== Original design ====
The AC15 debuted in January 1958 and was manufactured in Sussex, England. It originally came in an early Fender-style "TV-front" format with a cream-colored Rexine covering and a diamond-patterned grill cloth. As guitarists typically sat behind their amps at this time, the control panel was on top of the chassis and faced the rear, giving guitarists easy access to the controls for the AC15's two channels, Normal and Vibrato. The panel was originally black with white knobs. A three-way rotary switch controlled the speed of the Vibrato channel's on-board vibrato effect. Both channels had volume knobs and a shared tone control, along with two inputs each. The AC15 used two ECC83 valves in the preamp and two EL84s in a Class A power amp in cathode bias with no negative feedback loop; a 5Z4 valve was used for the rectifier. Its vibrato effect was identical in design to the JMI Vibravox phase shift/modulation effects unit, which used two ECC83s and an additional ECC82.

==== Redesigns ====
Beginning in late-1959, the AC15 went through multiple tonal and aesthetic changes. Denney redesigned the preamp around an EF86 pentode valve in channel two, which gave it a thicker, more powerful tone, and changed the rectifier to an EZ81. The Vibravox-style effect was scrapped in favor of a simpler, ECF82-valve-driven tremolo effect with its controls moved to the back of the amp, but the location was reverted a few months later with a return to using an ECC82 valve. By 1960, the AC15's controls included a switch to choose between tremolo and vibrato effects, along with a speed knob (depth was controlled via an internal trim pot); a bright switch for the Normal channel; and a "Top Cut" control for both channels to roll off high frequencies in the output stage.

The amp's single 12" speaker was updated to the Celestion T530 (a version of their G12 model later known as the Alnico Blue) from the original Goodmans Audiom 60. The cabinet also received an aesthetic overhaul. A two-tone TV-front design was used for the AC15 for a short time but it was replaced by Vox's now-classic use of a fawn Rexine (then black vinyl) upper portion of the cabinet front with the lower portion remaining diamond-patterned grill cloth. Smaller changes included the introduction of brass vent louvers and leather handles.

=== Decline ===
Less than two years after its introduction, the AC15 was regarded as under-powered for the larger venues rock and roll artists found themselves playing in. Hank Marvin—one of the AC15's earliest fans—approached Vox for a more powerful version of the amp so his guitar work could be heard over screaming fans. By the spring of 1959, Vox had already launched their solution, a TV-front, AC15-style amp in which the two EL84 power tubes had been replaced with a pair of EL34s for 30 watts of power. That model lasted only a year. Vox returned to EL84s (now using four) and added a second 12" speaker to the cabinet in 1960 to create the most recognizable iteration of the brand's AC30.

As for the AC15, black and basketweave coverings were offered in 1963, but by the following year it was discontinued. A combo version with two 12" speakers—the AC15 Twin—was produced until 1966 when JMI discontinued all of its amplifiers except the AC30 Twin and AC50 Super Twin. Because the AC30 underwent a preamp and tone stack redesign in 1960, the AC15 is not just an AC30 with half the power; rather, it retains its own sonic character.

=== Reissues ===
In 1996, Vox—now under the ownership of Korg—issued the brand's first AC15 amplifier in 26 years, the AC15TBRX, which featured an AC30-style Top Boost circuit ("TB"), reverb ("R"), and used Celestion's reissued Alnico Blue speaker ("X"). The amp was popular, but Vox chose to cancel its TBX lineup in 2004 in favor of producing its AC15 and AC30 models in China as part of a new "Custom Classic" series. In 2007, Vox released the hand-wired "Heritage Series" AC15H1TV. In 2025, Vox released another hand-wired AC15, the AC-15 Hand-Wired, with this model seeking to replicate the original amps as closely as possible.

== Players ==
One of the AC15's earliest adopters was the Shadows' guitarist Hank Marvin, who used it on the band's first UK Singles Chart number one record, "Apache", in 1960. John Lennon of the Beatles received an AC15 Twin in 1962. The Rolling Stones, the Kinks, and the Yardbirds, among others, all used AC15s on their early records, although they would also all switch to the AC30 before long. Not all guitarists prefer the AC30, however. Alternative rock artists like Kevin Shields of My Bloody Valentine and J Mascis of Dinosaur Jr. have both used the AC15, as have Alex Turner of Arctic Monkeys and Caleb Followill of Kings of Leon.
