= Jennings Musical Instruments =

Electronic instrument company

Jennings Musical Instruments is a manufacturer of musical instruments, and the original owner of the Vox brand. The company was founded by Thomas Walter Jennings.

== History ==
The Jennings Organ Company was founded by Thomas Walter Jennings in Dartford, Kent, England in 1950. Jennings' first successful product was the Univox, an early mains powered electronic keyboard with built-in valve amplifier and loudspeaker, similar to the Clavioline. There is some debate over whether the Clavioline or Univox was used in the song Telstar, but many think that it was the latter.

In 1956, Jennings was shown a prototype guitar amplifier made by Dick Denney, a big band guitarist and workmate from WWII. Denney was going deaf and invented the Vox amp so that he could still hear himself play. Richard Mann, a friend of Dick's drew up the first blueprints, which were presented to Jennings of Bexleyheath. Dick Denney received very little for his invention but continued to design from a workshop built in the garden of his council house in Erith, Kent. The company was renamed Jennings Musical Industries or JMI, and in 1958 the 15-watt Vox AC15 amplifier was launched, and was popularized by The Shadows and other British rock 'n' roll musicians. Its more famous product, AC30 was launched in 1959, and later used by The Beatles on their first two albums.

In 1964, Tom Jennings, in order to raise capital for JMI's expansion, sold a controlling interest in JMI to the Royston Group, a British holding company, and sold American rights to the California-based Thomas Organ Company. Displeased with the direction his old company was taking, he left the company in 1967, roughly the same time that Marshall overtook Vox as the dominant force in the British guitar amplifier market. While Royston's Vox Sound Equipment division set up new operations in the Kent town of Erith, Jennings set up a new company in his old Dartford location, joined later by Dick Denney. Jennings Electronic Industries operated for several years, making an updated and rebadged version of the AC30 along with other amplifiers, as well as a new range of organs.

Following the establishment of Jennings Electronic Industries (JEI) in Dartford, Michael Edward Huckle played a key role in the development of an updated version of the AC30 amplifier. With a background in electronic engineering, Huckle contributed to the design improvements and production of JEI’s amplifier range. Under his leadership, the company modernized the AC30 while maintaining its signature tone, ensuring its continued popularity among musicians. Dick Denney later joined JEI, and together they expanded the product line to include additional amplifiers and a new range of organs.

The Tom Jennings-led JMI Company folded in 1968 and the brand lay dormant for almost 30 years.

=== Re-birth ===
In 1997, Richard and Justin Harrison, then owners of Hiwatt amplification UK and Music Ground Ltd, purchased the "JMI" trademark. At the time the Vox brand was owned by Korg, and unlike the Korg Vox amplifiers being manufactured then, the Harrisons wanted to make exact reproductions of the original Jennings-Denney designs.

In early days of the new JMI, a small number of 50W and 100W hand-wired heads were produced, as well as cabinets, to test the waters for a re-launch. As the Hiwatt brand grew larger, the desire to produce the JMI amplifiers grew stronger and stronger; many of the Harrisons' regular customers were asking on a monthly basis when the amplifiers were to be manufactured for general sale.

The pivotal point of the JMI rebirth was the meeting of amplifier engineer and JMI enthusiast Steve Giles with co-owner Richard Harrison. Giles had previously built amplifiers based on Jennings’ designs, which impressed Richard Harrison to such an extent that some prototype models were made.

In 2005 the company decided to make models JMI 15/4, JMI 30/4, JMI 30/6 and the JMI 30TV Front. The amps were made available in the classic black, smooth tolex and a 100% replica of the original fawn tolex. Other options included a choice of speakers, either Celestion Greenback or JMI (Fane made) Blue Alnico Speakers. A new JMI gold logo adorned the front of the cabinets, completing the product made to the original Jennings/Denney specifications.

After positive feedback from a sample amplifier taken to the Namm show of 2006 the amplifiers were launched for general sale in the March of that year, showcasing at the Frankfurt Musikmesse at the end of March 2006. Also, as an added option, the company offered a rear-mounted top boost on all 30W models.

The company was asked to revive other classic models such as the 4W combo, 15 Twin, 50W head, 100W head and cabinets which came into production in 2007 (showcased at the Namm 2007). Since the rebirth the new JMI amplifiers have found their way into the hands such as Noel Gallagher, and Billy Gibbons.

== JMI Pedals ==
In late 2008, JMI launched two fx pedals to accompany their range of handmade products. These were the MKII Tone Bender and Treble Booster. The MKII Tone Bender featured a cast chassis as per the original and used New Old Stock Mullard OC-75 Transistors. The Treble booster was to feature a circuit based on the famous Dallas Rangemaster using an OC-44 NOS transistor. Early examples of each pedals are simply spray painted (around 50 Units); later they were powder coated which looked much more authentic to the original. Early packaging was a simple box rubber stamped Tone Bender with a cloth bag also stamped with the same brand. Later examples have the white box with Dallas Style Tone Bender Stickers on the outer and come with a photocopied leaflet of the pedals.

Inside, the pedals were marked either SG, NB or KM: SG Standing for Steve Giles, NB being Nick Browning and KM denoting Kee Mayer, JMI Engineers from Doncaster, England.

== See also ==
- Vox Musical Equipment
