= Vox AC30 =

Guitar amplifier

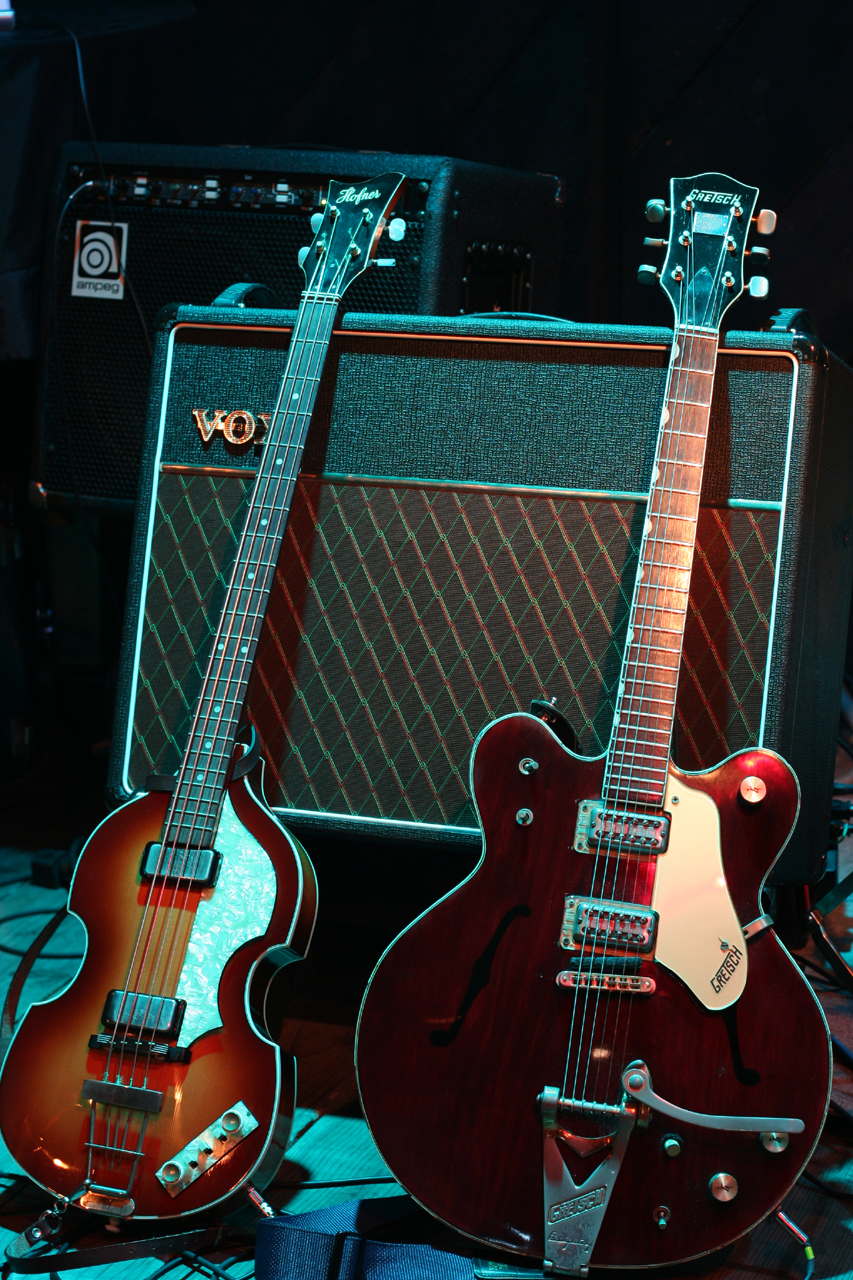
A Vox AC30 behind a replica of Paul McCartney's Höfner 500/1 bass and George Harrison's Gretsch Country Gentleman guitar

The Vox AC30 is a guitar amplifier produced by the British manufacturer Vox. The AC30 was introduced in 1959 as a higher-wattage solution to players wanting more volume than the company's AC15 could deliver. The first version was an EL34 valve-powered combo with a single 12" speaker, but this was discontinued in 1960 in favor of a format using two 12" speakers and four of the EL84 valves used in the AC15. Vox subsequently revised the preamp and added a "Top Boost" tone circuit, and in doing so created the "archetypal" Vox AC30 iteration.

The AC30's characteristically "jangly" tone and increased power made it a favorite amplifier of guitarists in the British Invasion, including the Beatles, the Rolling Stones, and the Kinks. Other notable guitarists to have used the AC30 include Brian May of Queen, Tom Petty, the Edge of U2, and Peter Buck of R.E.M. The AC30 is regarded as one of the most influential amplifiers of all time, with Guitar World including it alongside the Fender Deluxe Reverb and Marshall Super Lead as one of the three amplifiers "that built the sound of recorded guitar."

== History ==
=== Vox AC15 ===
In early 1958, Jennings Musical Industries (JMI) released its first-ever guitar amplifier, the EL84-powered Vox AC15 combo. JMI founder Tom Jennings hoped to take advantage of both the growing popularity of electric guitar-driven rock and roll in the United Kingdom and a trade embargo on American-made musical instruments that meant Fender's products were expensive and difficult to acquire. Designed by engineer Dick Denney, the AC15 and its "jangly" tone proved a success thanks to players like Hank Marvin of the Shadows and numerous artists of the British Invasion. Fifteen watts, however, proved insufficient for the larger venues these bands soon found themselves playing in and demand grew for a more powerful option from Vox.

=== Vox AC30 ===
==== 1x12 combo ====
In 1959, Vox released the AC30 as its follow-up to the AC15. Denney responded to the demand for a louder alternative primarily by swapping the AC15's pair of EL84 power amp valves for two EL34s instead, since a pair of EL34s could produce up to 50 watts. Aesthetically, the AC30 remained similar to its predecessor, using the same pale Rexine covering, diamond-patterned grill cloth, and square "TV-front"-style enclosure of the AC15, which in turn was similar to the styling of Fender's amplifiers of the 1940s and 1950s. Controls for these early AC30s consisted of Volume 1 (Vibrato channel) and Volume 2 (Normal channel), a shared tone control, a "tremulant" on/off switch, a three-position switch for vibrato speed, and voltage selection. This 1x12 AC30 would be produced into 1960, briefly alongside subsequent iterations of the amp design.

==== AC30/4 and AC30/6 Twins ====
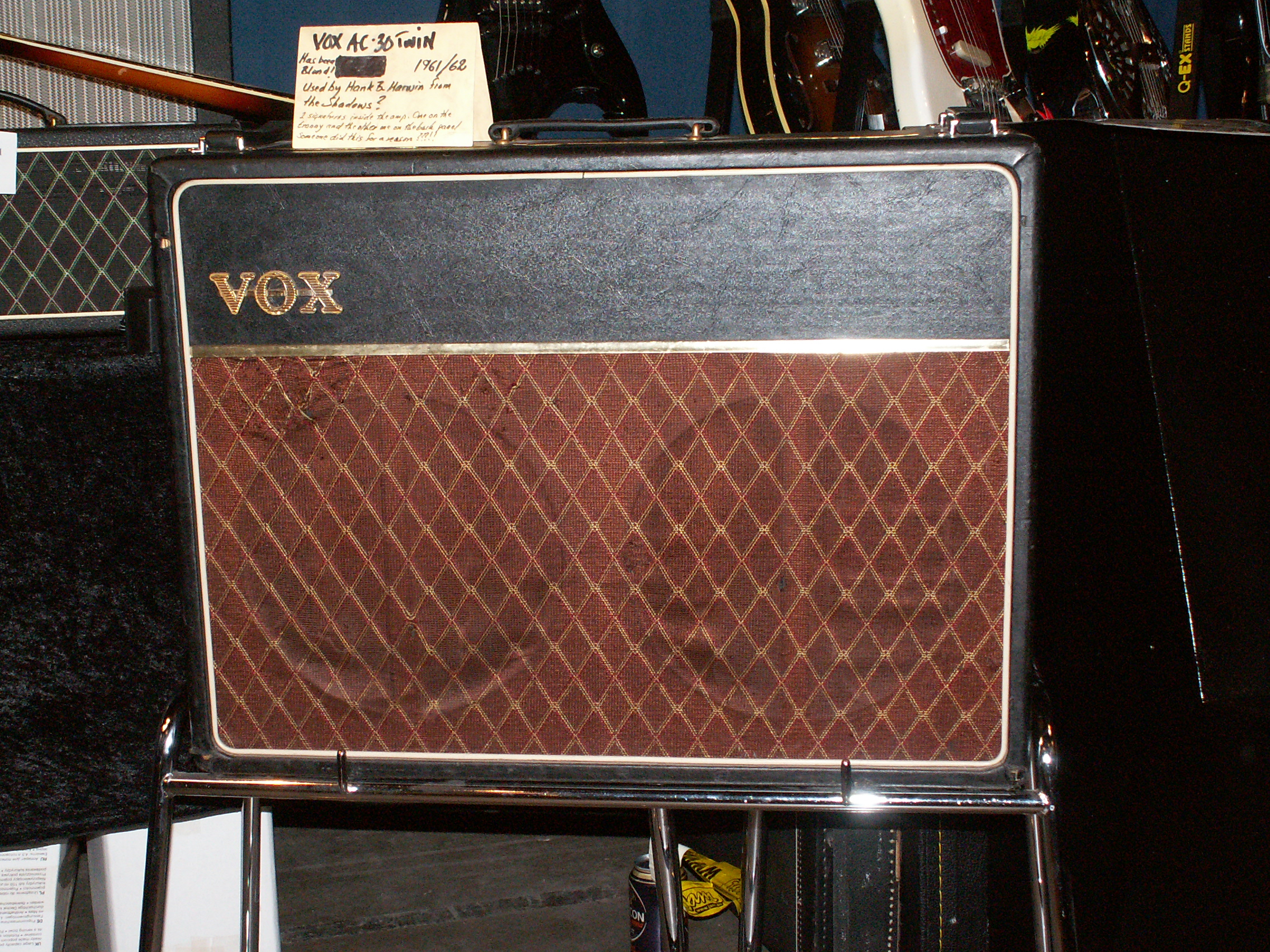
A Vox AC30 Twin

Inspired by the Fender Twin with its dual 12" speakers, Vox designed two 2x12 "Twin" combos as successors to the original 1x12 AC30: the AC30/4 and AC30/6, with both schematics originally dated April 29, 1960. These amplifiers marked a return to the EL84 valves of the AC15, but now employed a quartet of them alongside a GZ34 rectifier valve and a larger transformer compared to the AC15.

The AC30/4 had two channels—Normal and Vib-Trem, with vibrato and tremolo effects—with two inputs each (hence the "4"), while the AC30/6 had two inputs for each of three channels ("6"). In addition to the Normal and Vib-Trem channels of the AC30/4, the AC30/6 included a new Brilliant channel that offered players a brighter tonal option. For the AC30/6, Vox also swapped the Normal channel's EF86 preamp valve for the more common ECC83 (12AX7): the EF86 would become "extremely microphonic" when exposed to mechanical vibrations for long periods, a greater issue for the louder AC30 than the AC15 that the design had been inherited from.

Cosmetically, Vox followed Fender's lead and abandoned the TV-front styling used for both brands' earlier models. The front baffle was now divided by a thin gold-toned strip, with the upper valence covered in the same "fawn" Rexine used for the cabinet, while the lower grille maintained the brand's characteristically brown, diamond-patterned cloth. Ventilation was provided by three small brass vents on the top of the cabinet, and the single suitcase-type handle was replaced with three leather straps.

Earlier Vox amps had started out with Goodmans Axiom and later Celestion G12 speakers, but original designer Denney had never been happy with either of them. The AC30 Twins instead originally came with Rola B024 speakers that were soon deemed not durable enough. Vox and Celestion collaborated on a new speaker design, settling in August 1960 on what was dubbed the Celestion T.530. It originally came in a pink/silver color but this was updated to a "Vox blue" a few months later. This speaker model is regarded as a key factor in the Vox sound.

While the AC30/4 was released before the AC30/6, it was discontinued in September 1961 after a year of concurrent production with its three-channel sibling. The AC30/6 was subsequently known as the AC30/6 Normal, which was followed in the next few years by a mellower Bass model and brighter Treble model.

In 1961, Vox also introduced an AC30 amp head variant, the AC30 Super Twin, with a matching 4x12 cabinet.

==== Top Boost ====
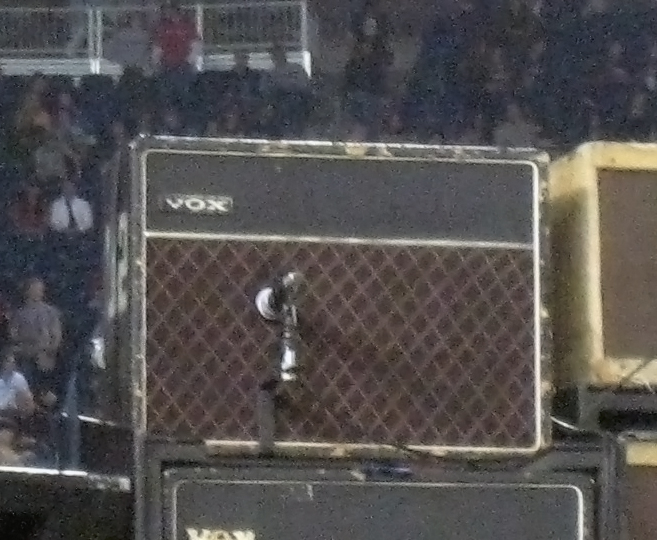
The Edge's Vox AC30/6 from 1964

For many players, the "archetypal" AC30 was not born until the introduction of the "Top Boost" tone circuit, which was an adaptation of the Fender Bassman tone stack, but with the middle control removed and the circuit tweaked for the AC30. The Top Boost circuit started out in 1961 as a retrofit performed at the factory for players who already owned an AC30 but were looking for a brighter sound from it. An extra preamp tube would be added and a plate with the circuit's bass and treble controls would be installed in the rear of the amp with access via a cutout in the back panel. In 1963, Vox began integrating the Top Boost modification as a standard feature on the AC30/6 with the new bass and treble controls added to the top control panel. The Top Boost proved widely popular for the extra gain and "shimmer and chime" it added. That same year, Vox began offering a black vinyl covering in place of the fawn Rexine. By this point, most of the AC15's endorsers had switched to the AC30, including the Beatles, and Beatlemania helped propel Vox to great success on both sides of the Atlantic.

In early 1964, Vox released the AC30 Expanded Frequency Fifteen (AC30X), a 2x15 combo with the Top Boost. Higher-wattage versions of the AC30 like the AC50 and AC100 (both using EL34s) were developed for players—namely the Beatles—looking for ever-higher volumes as audiences grew. But because they did not distort until higher volumes compared to other famous amps of the day, the AC50 and AC100 have never attained the same level of demand on the vintage market as the AC15 or AC30.

==== Jennings leaves Vox ====
Jennings was in desperate need of capital by the mid-1960s to continue expanding and taking advantage of the rock and roll boom. In 1964, he sold a majority stake in Vox to the Royston Group, which promptly struck a deal with an American manufacturer to build Vox-branded, solid-state amps which were considered to be of poor quality and hurt the company's reputation. While high-quality Vox tube amps continued being made in England, all models but the AC30 Twin and AC50 Super Twin were discontinued in 1966. Jennings and Denney departed Vox the following year.

In 1970, a struggling JMI—losing market-share to brands like Marshall and Hiwatt—became Vox Sound Ltd., which released a revised AC30 using cheaper printed circuit boards rather than hand-wired production techniques. CBS-Arbiter bought the company two years later, with Jennings staying on as a consultant until his death in 1978. Manufacturing was moved to a new plant, but the result was poorer-quality amplifiers. Rose Morris—Marshall's soon-to-be ex-distributer—was next to buy the Vox brand, to mixed results. At the same time, 1960s JMI-built AC30s became highly sought-after on the burgeoning vintage market. In 1990, Rose Morris released a limited edition run of AC30s with improved specs and had success, and a standard production model dubbed the AC30 Vintage followed.

==== Korg ownership ====
Hurt by a recession, Rose Morris sold Vox to the Japanese company Korg in late 1992. Korg and Vox made multiple improvements to the AC30, most notably bringing back the GZ34 rectifier and the then-newly-reissued Celestion Alnico Blue speaker. A few years later, the revised AC30TBX was highly-thought-of and helped keep the Vox brand profitable. Vox discontinued the TBX line of amps in 2004 in order to go in two different directions: the AC30CC (Custom Classic) was made in China as a budget option, while the limited edition, high-end Handwired AC30 offered players the closest thing to a vintage copy on the market. Vox's move to manufacturing in China was criticized at the time, but Vox argued full production in the U.K. was no longer viable. Other iterations of the AC30 released in the new millennium include the Brian May signature AC30BM (2006); the Custom series (2010), an update to the Custom Classics; and the AC30 Hand-Wired (2025).

== Tone ==
According to Guitar World, the Vox AC30 is famous for its "honky midrange and sparkling high-end frequencies," which give the amp a clarity that excels in both recording and live scenarios. In the hands of many guitarists of the British Invasion, including George Harrison and John Lennon, the AC30 helped create a distinctly "jangly" guitar tone that defined much of the sound of rock music in the 1960s. The AC30 however can lack the "warmth" of other popular amplifiers due to its lack of low-end—especially at low volumes or in conjunction with the Top Boost circuit—but this is less of an issue at high volume levels. The AC30 has enough headroom to provide attractive clean tones of their own character compared to Fender or Marshall amp models, but still breaks up easily when pushed enough. Queen guitarist Brian May has highlighted the "smooth transition into compression and distortion" of the AC30, which excels when set between fully clean and fully distorted.

Much of the AC30's characteristic tones are the result of its speaker choice. The AC30 is mostly associated with Celestion's "Blue Alnico" speaker model, which has a slightly softened treble response with a "bell-like top end and natural compression" at high volumes. Some modern editions of the AC30 have used Celestion Greenback speakers to cut costs, with that speaker model having a slightly harsher quality.

== Electronics ==
Though widely believed to be a class A amplifier, the AC30 is in fact class AB. It uses a quartet of cathode-biased EL-84 output tubes in push-pull configuration. The high bias condition is believed by some to be the source of the amplifier's famous immediate response and "jangly" high-end, though the lack of negative feedback, minimal preamp circuit, simple low loss tone stack, and the use of cathode biasing on the output stage play at least as large a role, if not larger. The Celestion "Blue" speakers that are integral to the AC30 also contribute much to the sound of the unit. The two 12" 15-watt speakers, often overdriven and at the brink of their power handling capability, provide a cutting mid-range speaker sound that is immediate and sharp and a distinction from the Marshall or Fender-style amplifier.

== Notable players ==
The Vox AC30 is one of the most widely-used guitar amplifiers of all time, with Guitar World writing that it has been "championed by generations of musicians" and inspired entire genres of music. Hank Marvin of the Shadows was the first artist to play the AC30 after encouraging Vox to design an amp with more power than the AC15 could provide. Guitarists George Harrison and John Lennon of the Beatles helped cement the AC30's popularity, although they only used them for a period in 1963 before moving on to more powerful Vox models. Jeff Beck, Eric Clapton, and Jimmy Page all used AC30s with the Yardbirds. Other British Invasion bands like the Rolling Stones, the Kinks, and the Who used them as well. Rory Gallagher paired an AC30 with a Dallas Rangemaster Treble Booster; Brian May would do the same to create his signature "ultra-treble tones" with Queen and contribute to the AC30's continued popularity in the 1970s. After starting out with larger models like the Vox Super Beatle, Tom Petty and Mike Campbell switched to AC30s as their main amps for much of their careers. The Edge was known for combining AC30s with effects pedals like delays to create "shimmering" textures on many U2 songs. Outside of rock, jazz virtuoso John Scofield favored the AC30. In the 1990s and into the new millennium, Peter Buck of R.E.M., Dave Grohl of the Foo Fighters, Ed O'Brien and Thom Yorke of Radiohead, and Matt Bellamy of Muse have all used the AC30, as has country artist Brad Paisley.

== See also ==
- Matchless Amplifiers, founded to produce more durable Vox-style amp models
