= Vox AC50 =

The Vox AC50 is a guitar amplifier head and accompanying speaker cabinet manufactured by Vox. It was introduced in 1964 to meet the growing demand for louder amplifiers during the British Invasion era of rock and roll live performances. Most notable performers that used the AC50 was The Beatles as well as several other British pop rock bands during the mid to late 60's.

== Amp Head ==
The head of the first AC50 MKI model originally had 2 inputs. 1 for a warmer "Normal" channel and another for a brighter "Brilliant" channel that sounds more comparable to a Vox AC30. The later MKII and MKIII models have 4 channels to meet the varied input needs of musicians. While the amp's output provided larger sound than the Vox AC30, the tube design called for two EL34 output tubes to achieve the power needed for tonal clarity. The preamp tubes were consistently one ECC82 (12AU7) tube and three ECC83 (12AX7) tubes. Early designs came outfitted with a GZ34 rectifier tube, while latter MKIII models housed a more predictable and stable diode rectifier to support the power supply.

== Amp Cabinet ==
The AC50 many times accompanied the amplifier head with a speaker trolley cabinet loaded with Silver Alnico or Blue Alnico speakers and a Goodmans Midax Horn to push more bright clear sounds out into large crowds. The speaker trolley was designed to change in speaker tilt angle for adjusting down or up based on crowd locations beyond a main stage.

== Production Years ==
The golden era of production for the Vox AC50 occurred between 1964-1969. With the most popular models being produced by Jennings Musical Instruments, or otherwise known as JMI.
