= Tone Bender =

Name of several effect pedals

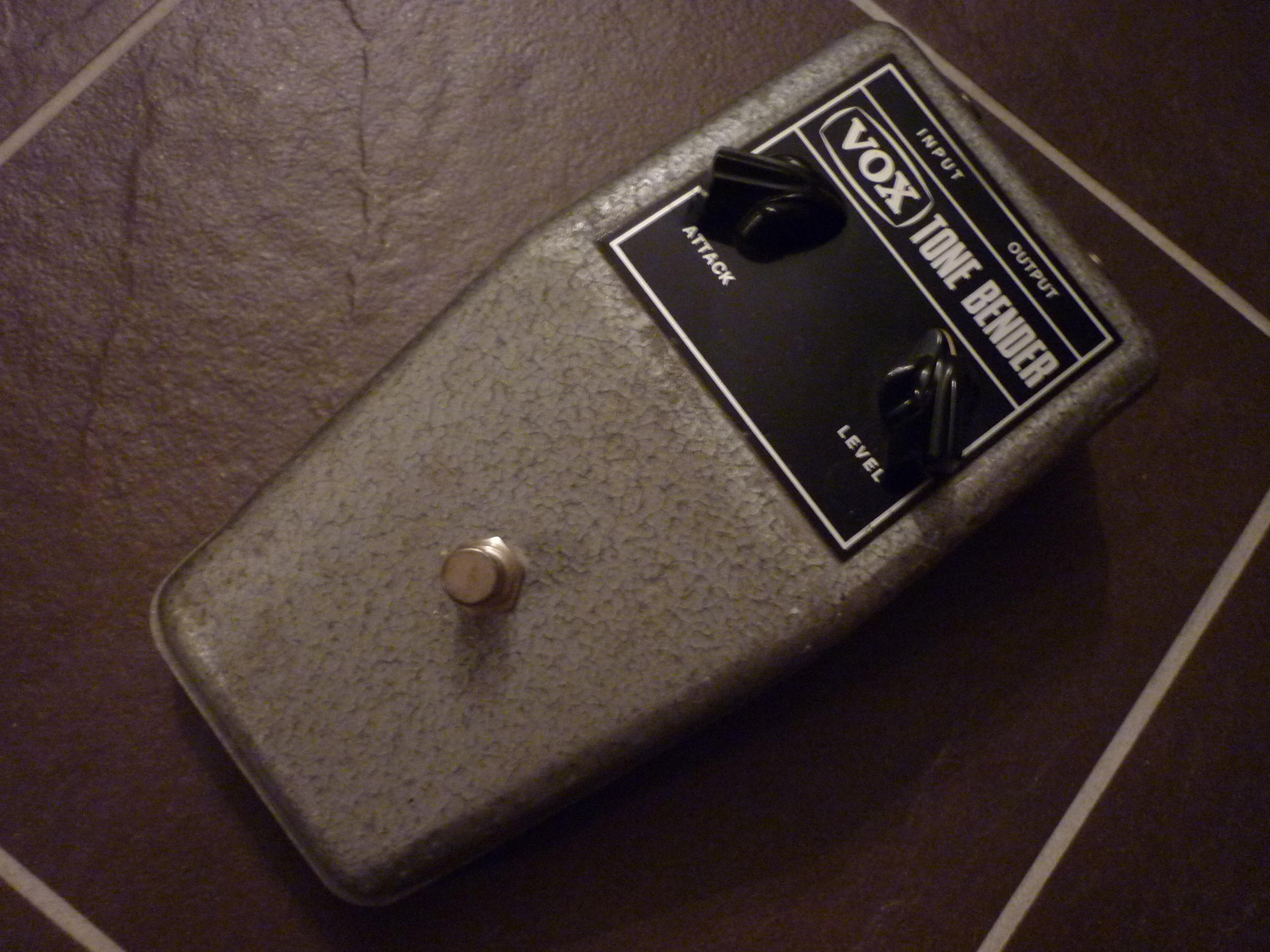
A 1966 Vox Tone Bender.

Tone Bender is the name of several fuzz distortion effect pedals. Released in 1965, Sola Sound's original Tone Bender was a re-creation of the popular Maestro Fuzz-Tone, but with more sustain and intended for the European market. For U.S. distribution, Vox released a version in 1967 based on Sola Sound's MK1.5 Tone Bender update, one of many the pedal went through. With different component values and transistors being used over the years, earlier variants are fuller sounding, while later ones are bright and cutting. Notable examples of the Tone Bender in use include Jeff Beck's sitar-like guitar solo on the Yardbirds' 1965 song "Heart Full of Soul" and Mick Ronson's guitar work on David Bowie's 1972 song "Moonage Daydream".

== Models ==
=== Sola Sound Tone Bender MKI (mid-1965) ===
The first incarnation of the Tone Bender was designed by electronics engineer and former Vox employee Gary Hurst, who claimed he was approached by a session guitarist with a request for a pedal that would emulate the sound of an Gibson Maestro Fuzz-Tone, but with more sustain. The identity of the guitarist is disputed, with Hurst claiming it was Vic Flick, but Flick himself denying he had his FZ-1 modified. Big Jim Sullivan claimed to have asked Hurst to modify his FZ-1.

The Tone Bender utilized a three-transistor circuit based on the FZ-1. Early incarnations in mid-1965 were housed in wooden enclosures, which were later replaced by folded steel enclosures. By September 1965 the pedal was being sold through the Macari brothers' Musical Exchange music stores, with later units bearing the Macari's Sola Sounds brand.

Notable examples of the Tone Bender MKI in use include Jeff Beck's sitar-like guitar solo on the Yardbirds' 1965 song "Heart Full of Soul" and Mick Ronson's guitar work on David Bowie's 1972 song "Moonage Daydream".

=== Sola Sound Tone Bender ("MK1.5") ===
Introduced in February 1966, this successor of the original Tone Bender has a two transistor circuit which is essentially a negative feedback amplifier. A rounded, sand-cast aluminum enclosure with steel sheet metal base plate replaced the folded steel enclosure of the previous version. Although this was a de facto second version, no version number was used on its case. To differentiate it from the MKI and MKII, it is commonly referred to as the "MK1.5". This version was manufactured by Sola Sound in different guises as OEM products for other companies such as Rotosound. Another variant was the Rangemaster Fuzzbug. This version of the Tone Bender is the version upon which the Italian-made Vox Tone Bender is based.

An early variant of the Tone Bender MK1.5 featured a 500k volume pot instead of the more common 100k, providing a fuller low end. The bias point was slightly adjusted to make it less susceptible to temperature changes. The Arbiter Fuzz Face, which was released later in 1966, is a clone of this variant.

=== Sola Sound Tone Bender Professional MKII ===
The Tone Bender MKII is a three transistor circuit based on the MKI.5 version, but with an additional amplifier gain stage. Sola Sound produced the circuit for Vox (who sold their version as the "Vox Tone Bender Professional MKII"), Marshall (who sold their version as the "Marshall Supa Fuzz"), and Rotosound (who sold their version as the "RotoSound Fuzz Box". There also was a version of the short-lived Rangemaster Fuzzbug containing this circuit. Other variants may exist.

The Sola Sound and Vox version used the same sturdy, sand cast metal enclosure designed by Hurst for the MK1.5 version. In fact, most Sola Sound-branded MKIIs were probably leftover stock of MK1.5s with the circuit modified to MKII specs and a "Professional MKII" silkscreen added, presumably to differentiate them from the earlier version. These MK1.5 conversions can be identified by their smaller circuit board. Only a few Sola Sound-branded units with a large circuit board exist. It seems the last of them were rebranded from Sola Sound to Vox. After that point only Vox-branded Tone Bender Professional MKIIs seem to have been produced.

By November 1966, advertisements for the pedal in Beat Instrumental magazine marketed it as a "Gary Hurst Design". This circuit, utilizing Mullard OC75 or Impex S31T transistors, remained in production until early 1968. Shortly before production ended a batch of pedals using Mullard OC81D audio driver transistors had been made. Most of these are branded Vox Tone Bender Professional MKII, but Rotosound Fuzz Boxes and Marshall Supa Fuzzes from that era do exist. Marshall continued producing a slightly different-looking version of the Supa Fuzz until at least 1972.

Notable examples of the Tone Bender MKII in use include much of Jimmy Page's guitar work on Led Zeppelin's debut studio album, as well as well as Alan Parker's guitar work on Donovan's 1968 song "Hurdy Gurdy Man".

Beginning in 2009, Macari's resumed selling the Sola Sound Tone Bender Professional MKII for the first time in over 40 years as part of their Vintage Series of guitar pedals. It is being manufactured by Differential Audio Manifestationz (D*A*M) of South Yorkshire.

=== Sola Sound Tone Bender MKIII ===
The Sola Sound Tone Bender MKIII featured a three transistor circuit with a germanium diode and added tone control. The MKIII circuit was produced in several different enclosures and was available under different brands and models. Most MKIII Tone Benders are branded as Vox; the Sola Sound version is scarce. The Park Fuzz Sound and Rotosound Fuzz Box were also available with this circuit. This version is closely related to the Burns Baldwin Buzzaround.

A short-lived version of the MKIII with only two controls, and containing a circuit with four silicon transistors was also produced, and likely predates the more common germanium version.

=== Sola Sound Tone Bender MKIV / Tone-Bender Fuzz ===
By 1969 the same circuit used for the MKIII was sold in a smaller updated case as the Sola Sound Tone Bender MKIV (sold concurrently with the larger MKIII version). Also available in the smaller MKIV enclosure were the Carlsbro Fuzz and Park Fuzz Sound. By 1971 the MKIV's graphics were updated to market the pedal as the "Tone-Bender Fuzz" from that point onward. By the mid-70's it was also available in yet another enlclosure, branded as the CSL Super Fuzz. The circuit was discontinued around 1976 and reintroduced in 2012, once again with MKIV graphics.

=== Colorsound Supa Tone Bender ===
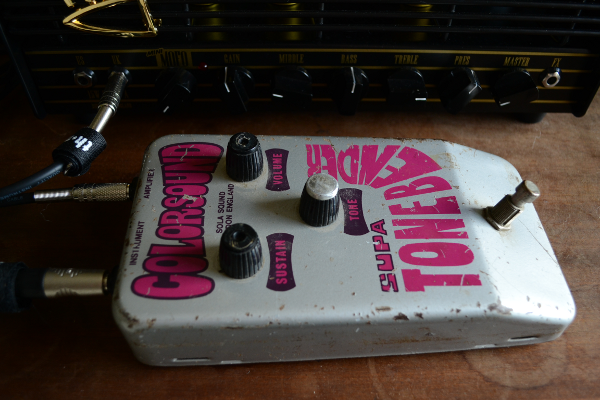
A 1974 Colorsound Supa Tone Bender

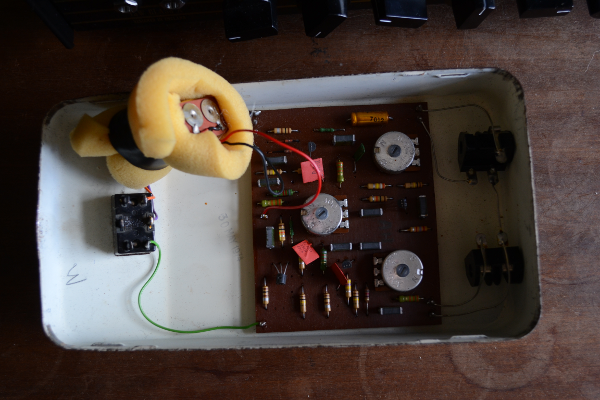
The innards of a 1974 Colorsound Supa Tone Bender

The Colorsound Supa Tonebender utilizes a four transistor circuit based on the Electro-Harmonix Big Muff π. It was produced by Sola Sound for its subsidiary, Colorsound.

=== Colorsound Jumbo Tone Bender ===
The Colorsound Jumbo Tone Bender is a three transistor circuit based on the Electro-Harmonix Big Muff π. Sola Sound made this pedal under various names, in various enclosures and for various distributors. It can be found in a narrow Colorsound enclosure with the same graphics as the late germanium Tone Benders, a wide Colorsound enclosure with Jumbo ToneBender graphics, in Vox MKIII Tone Bender enclosures, in a different narrow enclosure rebranded as B&M (Champion) Fuzz, B&M Fuzz Unit, CMI Fuzz Unit, G.B. Fuzz, G.B. Fuzz Unit or Pro Traffic Fuzz Unit or in a smaller enclosure labeled as the Eurotec Black Box Fuzz Module. The same circuit was also part of the Colorsound Supa Wah-Fuzz-Swell.

=== Vox Tone Bender ===
The Vox Tone Bender (model no. V828 in Vox's 1966 US price list) is based on the same circuit topology as the Sola Sound Tone Bender MK1.5. It was manufactured for the Thomas Organ Company by the JEN company in Italy. This circuit uses different component values and transistor types, making it different in tone and behavior. Unlike the UK-built MK1.5, this version used a PCB. Different transistor and capacitor setups have been used over the years. Earlier variants are fuller sounding, while later ones are rather bright and cutting. It is assumed that these were initially made for the US market, while the Sola Sound versions were distributed in the UK and Europe.

JEN used the enclosures and circuit boards to make Fuzz for other companies such as Elka, Gretch and Luxor. They also released it under their own name of JEN and used the enclosure for a range of other effects.

== Trademarks ==
British music instruments and equipment retailer Macari's Limited, who has built and sold Tone Benders since 1965 owns the Sola Sound brand, and the Tone Bender trademark in the U.K. and Europe since 2007. Korg owned some Tone Bender trademarks in the United States in the 1990s.

== See also ==
- List of distortion pedals
