= Vox (company) =

Musical equipment manufacturer

- Vox Amplification logo
- Type: Privately held company
- Industry: Musical instruments
- Founded: 1957; 69 years ago
- Founder: Thomas Walter Jennings
- Headquarters: Dartford, Kent, England
- Area served: Global
- Products: Electric guitars Bass guitars Amplifiers; Electronic organs Electric ukuleles Electric mandolins
- Parent: Korg
- Website: voxamps.com

Vox is a British musical equipment manufacturer founded in 1957 by Thomas Walter Jennings in Dartford, Kent, England. The company is most famous for making the AC15 and AC30 guitar amplifiers, used by the Beatles, the Rolling Stones, the Kinks, the Yardbirds, Queen, Dire Straits, U2, and Radiohead; the Vox Continental electric organ; the Vox wah-wah pedal used by Jimi Hendrix; and a series of innovative electric guitars and bass guitars. Since 1992, Vox has been owned by the Japanese electronics firm Korg.

== History ==
=== Beginnings ===
The Jennings Organ Company was founded by Thomas Walter Jennings in Dartford, Kent, after World War II. Jennings's first successful product was the Univox, an early self-powered electronic keyboard similar to the Clavioline.

In 1956, Jennings was shown a prototype guitar amplifier made by Dick Denney, a big band guitarist and workmate from World War II. The company was renamed Jennings Musical Industries, or JMI. In 1958 the 15-watt Vox AC15 amplifier was launched; "vox" simply being the Latin word for "voice". It was popularised by the Shadows and other British rock and roll musicians and became a commercial success.

Vox released the 12-watt AC10 in late 1959 as a student model, originally as a 1x10-inch combo and later as a 2x10-inch combo. Features simplified from the AC15 included a tremolo effect (mislabeled as "vibrato"), a single, shared Tone control, and smaller output transformer. The AC10 was discontinued in 1965.

=== The AC30 ===
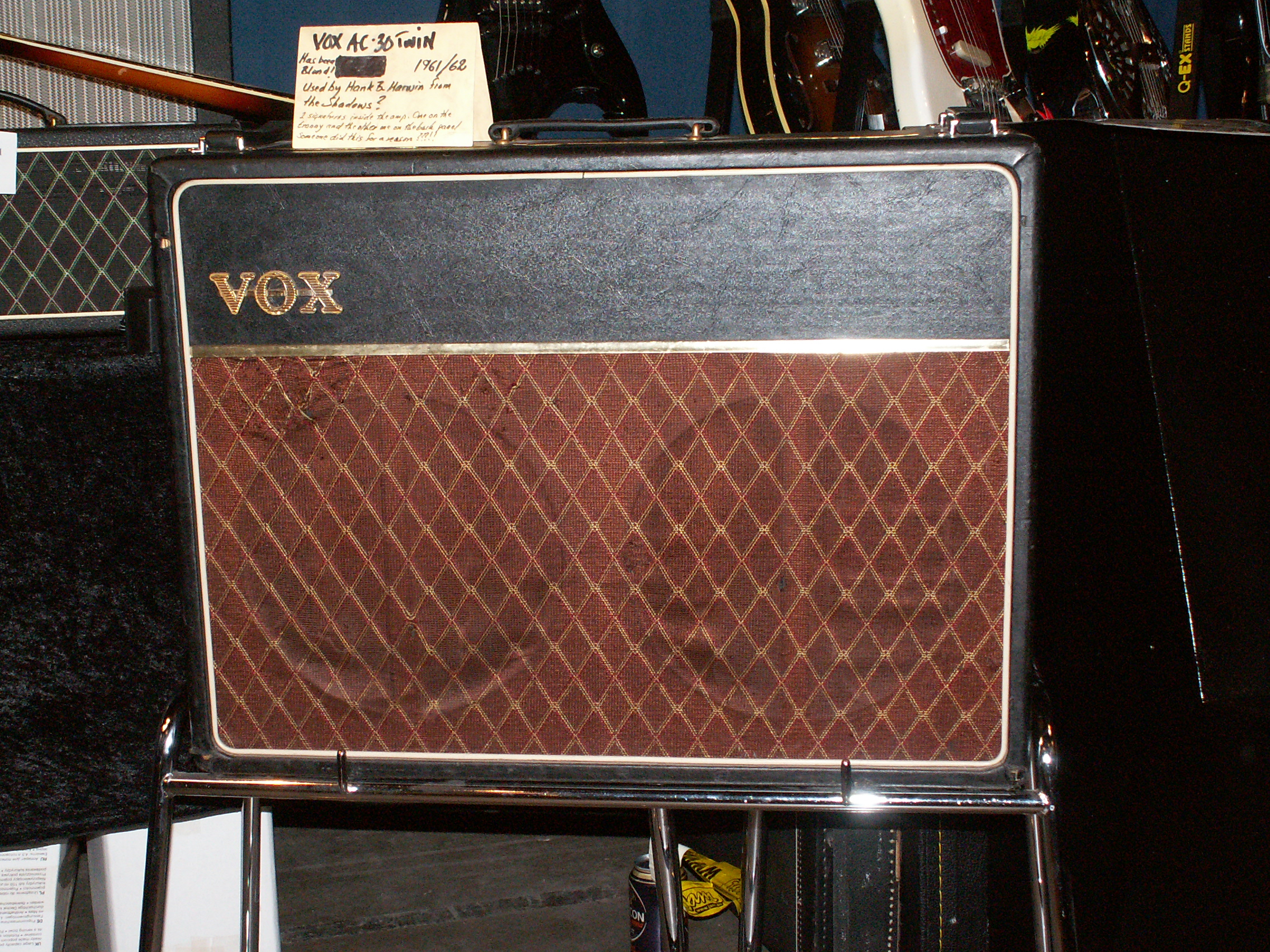
The Vox AC30 amplifier

In 1959, with sales under pressure from the more powerful Fender Twin, by request from the Shadows, who wanted amplifiers with more power, Vox produced what was essentially a double-powered AC15 and named it the AC30. The AC30, fitted with alnico magnet-equipped Celestion "blue" loudspeakers and later Vox's special "Top Boost" circuitry, and like the AC15 using valves (known in the US as vacuum tubes), helped to produce the sound of the British Invasion, being used by the Beatles, the Rolling Stones, the Kinks and the Yardbirds, among others. AC30s were later used by Brian May of Queen (who is known for having a wall of AC30s on stage), Paul Weller of The Jam (who also assembled a wall of AC30s), Rory Gallagher, The Edge of U2 and Radiohead guitarists Thom Yorke, Jonny Greenwood and Ed O'Brien. The Vox AC30 has been used by many other artists including Mark Knopfler, Hank Marvin who was instrumental in getting the AC30 made, Ritchie Blackmore, John Scofield, Snowy White, Will Sergeant, Tom Petty, The Echoes, Mike Campbell, Peter Buck, Justin Hayward, Tom DeLonge, Mike Nesmith, Peter Tork, Noel Gallagher, Matt Bellamy, Omar Rodriguez-Lopez, Dustin Kensrue, Tame Impala, Jimmy Page, Tony Iommi and many others.

=== Other amplifiers ===
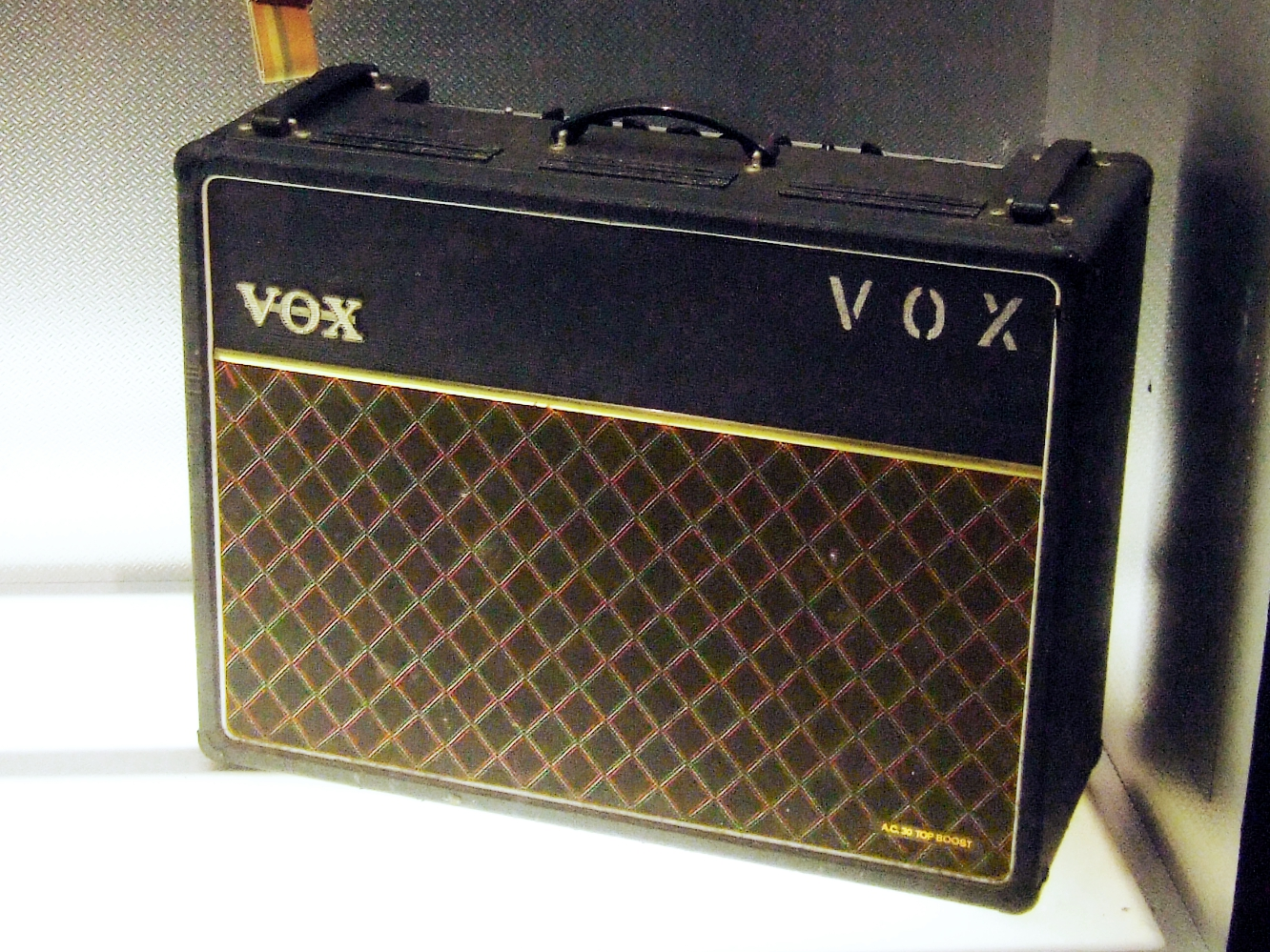
AC30 Top Boost

Once The Beatles became tied to Vox amplifiers (a deal was struck early in their recording career whereby they would be provided Vox equipment for exclusive stage use), the quest for more power began. John Lennon's first Vox was a fawn-coloured twin-speaker AC15, while George Harrison's was a fawn AC30 with a top boost unit installed in the rear panel. They were later provided with twin black-covered AC30s with the rear panel top boost units. Paul McCartney was provided with one of the first transistorised amplifiers, the infamous T60, which featured an unusual separate cabinet outfitted with a 12" and a 15" speaker. The T60 head had a tendency to overheat, and McCartney's was no exception, so he was then provided with an AC30 head which powered the T60's separate speaker cabinet.

As the crowds at Beatles shows got louder, they needed louder amps. Jennings provided Lennon and Harrison with the first AC50 piggyback units, and McCartney's AC30/T60 rig was replaced with an AC100 head and an AC100 2×15" cabinet. Lennon and Harrison eventually got their own AC100 rigs, with 4×12"/2-horn configurations. In 1966 and 1967, The Beatles had several prototype or specially-built Vox amplifiers, including hybrid tube/solid-state units from the short-lived 4- and 7-series. Harrison in particular became fond of the 730 amp and 2×12 cabinet, using them to create many of the guitar sounds found on Revolver and Sgt. Pepper's Lonely Hearts Club Band. Lennon favoured the larger 7120 amplifier, while Harrison preferred the 730 and McCartney had its sister 430 bass amplifier.

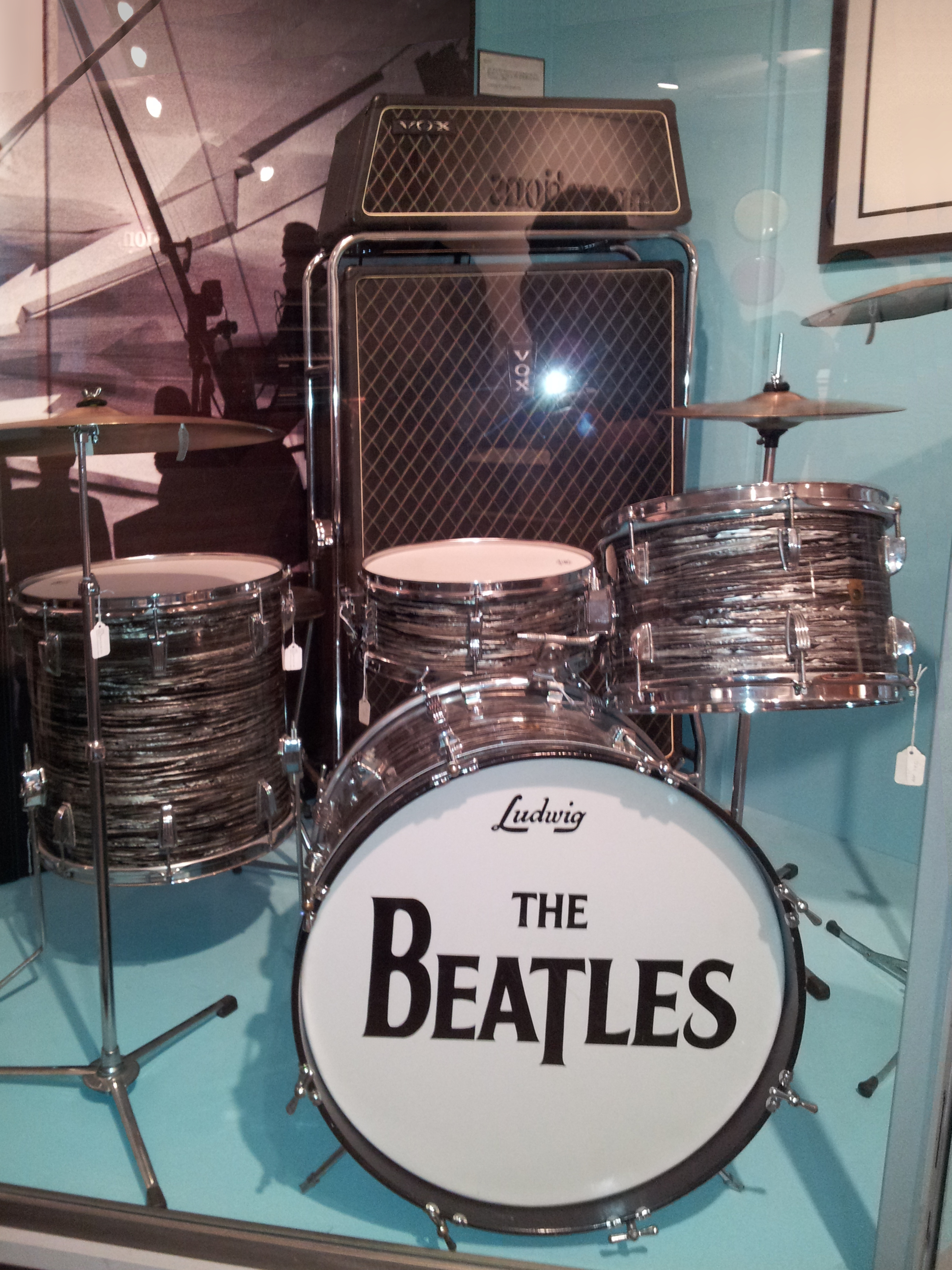
Vox Super Beatle (exhibited at Museum of Making Music)

In the early 1960s, the Brothers Grim became the first American group to use Vox Amplifiers. Joe Benaron, CEO of Warwick Electronics Inc. / Thomas Organ Company, the United States distributor of Vox, along with Bernard Stockly (London), importer of Challenge pianos to the United States, arranged for the boys to have full use of the tall Super AC 100 Vox amps (4×12" speakers). The solid-state version of this amp (known in the US as the "Super Beatle") was produced to cash in on the Beatles-Vox affiliation, but was not nearly as successful as the valve AC30 and AC15 models.

A modern popular rock artist known for use of the Super Beatle is Tom Petty and the Heartbreakers, although in the April 2008 issue of Premier Guitar, lead guitarist Mike Campbell revealed that the Super Beatle backline was, on their thirtieth anniversary tour at least, primarily used only as a stage prop, though Petty used his "on a couple of songs." In the group's early days, the Vox equipment was chosen because it was relatively inexpensive in 1976, yet had a handsome appearance. A photograph included in the article showed Campbell's guitar sound was coming from other amplifiers hidden behind the large Super Beatles, which Campbell stated were "a tweed Fender Deluxe and a blackface Fender Princeton together behind the Super Beatle, and an isolated Vox AC30 that I have backstage in a box."

The Monkees concealed themselves in large empty Vox cabinet and emerged from them as a grand entrance to the opening of the shows on the 1967 tour and they used real Vox amps for the performances.

=== Instruments ===
==== Guitars ====
| Vox Phantom VI | Vox Mark VI |

Vox's first electric guitars, the Apache, Stroller and Clubman were modeled after solid-body, bolt-neck Fenders, which at the time were not available in the UK. A four-string Clubman Bass followed shortly after. These first guitars were low-priced, had unusual TV connector output jacks and were produced by a cabinet maker in Shoeburyness, Essex. Vox president Tom Jennings commissioned London Design Centre to create a unique new electric guitar, and in 1962 Vox introduced the pentagonal Phantom, originally made in England but soon after made by EKO of Italy. The first Phantom guitars were given to The Echoes to trial in 1962 and were used by them until 1970. They can be heard on many of their recordings and records they did with other artists such as Dusty Springfield. Aside from the unusual body and headstock shapes, Phantoms featured copies of the Fender Stratocaster neck and its attachment, the Strat's three single-coil pick-ups and standard vibrato bridge that in this case copied a Bigsby unit. Aside from being a bit awkward to hold for seated playing, the Phantom guitars now approached professional quality, performance and price. Phil "Fang" Volk of Paul Revere & the Raiders played a Phantom IV bass (which was eventually retrofitted with a Fender neck). It was followed a year later by the teardrop-shaped Mark VI, the prototype of which had only two pick-ups (rather than three) and was made specifically for Brian Jones of The Rolling Stones, again using a Bigsby-like "Hank Marvin" bridge. By the end of the decade, Stones bassist Bill Wyman was shown in Vox advertisements playing a teardrop hollow-bodied bass made for him by the company, subsequently marketed as the Wyman Bass. Many guitar gear authorities dispute that he ever actually used the instrument for recording or live performance. (See also Vox Bass Guitar.)

Vox experimented with several built-in effects and electronics on guitars such as the Cheetah, Ultrasonic, and Invader. Ian Curtis of Joy Division is known to have owned two white Vox Phantom VI Special effects guitars which had push button switches on the scratch plate to activate the effects circuits. Another innovation was the Guitar Organ, which featured miniaturised VOX organ circuitry activated by the contact of the strings on the frets, producing organ tones in key with guitar notes in one of three ways. A switch on the instrument allow choosing between guitar only, organ only (holding down strings produced an organ tone without the string needing to be played in a traditional sense as mentioned) and a combination of both. This instrument was heavy and cumbersome with a steel neck and external circuit boxes. The initial production run proved unreliable due to the fact that JMI production engineers, eager to put the instrument into production, had used Denney's prototype as a template for wiring the instrument in Denney's absence. As a consequence, the instrument gained a negative reputation, but was a hallmark of the ingenuity of the company.

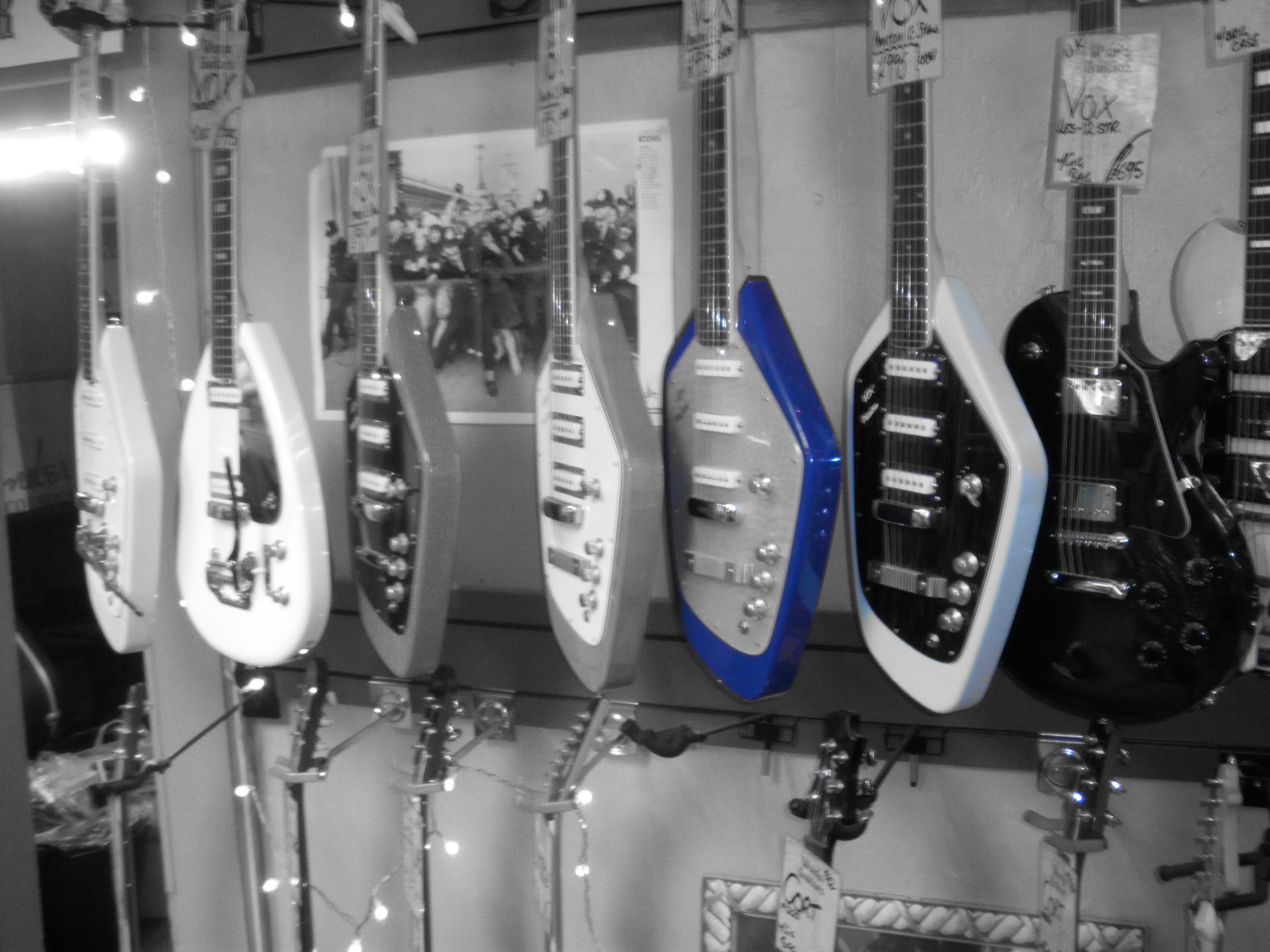
Vox guitars (Phantom XII is right white one)

In the mid-1960s, as the sound of electric 12-string guitars became popular, Vox introduced the Phantom XII, which was subsequently used by Tony Hicks of The Hollies, Captain Sensible of early English punk band The Damned and Greg Kihn; the Mark XII electric 12-string guitar and the Tempest XII, also made in Italy, which featured a more conventional body style. The Phantom XII and Mark XII both featured a unique Bigsby style 12-string vibrato tailpiece, which made them, along with Semie Moseley's "Ventures" model 12-string Mosrite, the only 12-string electric guitars to feature such a vibrato. The Stereo Phantom XII had split pick-ups resembling the Fender Precision bass, each half of which could be sent to a separate amplifier using an onboard mix control. Vox produced a number of other models of 6 and 12 string electric guitars in both England and Italy.

The Vox Mando-Guitar is a type of 12-string guitar fitted with a short-scale neck 15.5 inches (39 cm) and a small solid body. It is tuned one octave higher than a standard guitar, giving it the tonal range of a mandolin and enabling a guitarist to emulate the sound of a mandolin sound without learning new fingering patterns required for actual mandolins. The effect is similar to that of applying a capo to a standard 12-string guitar at its twelfth fret.

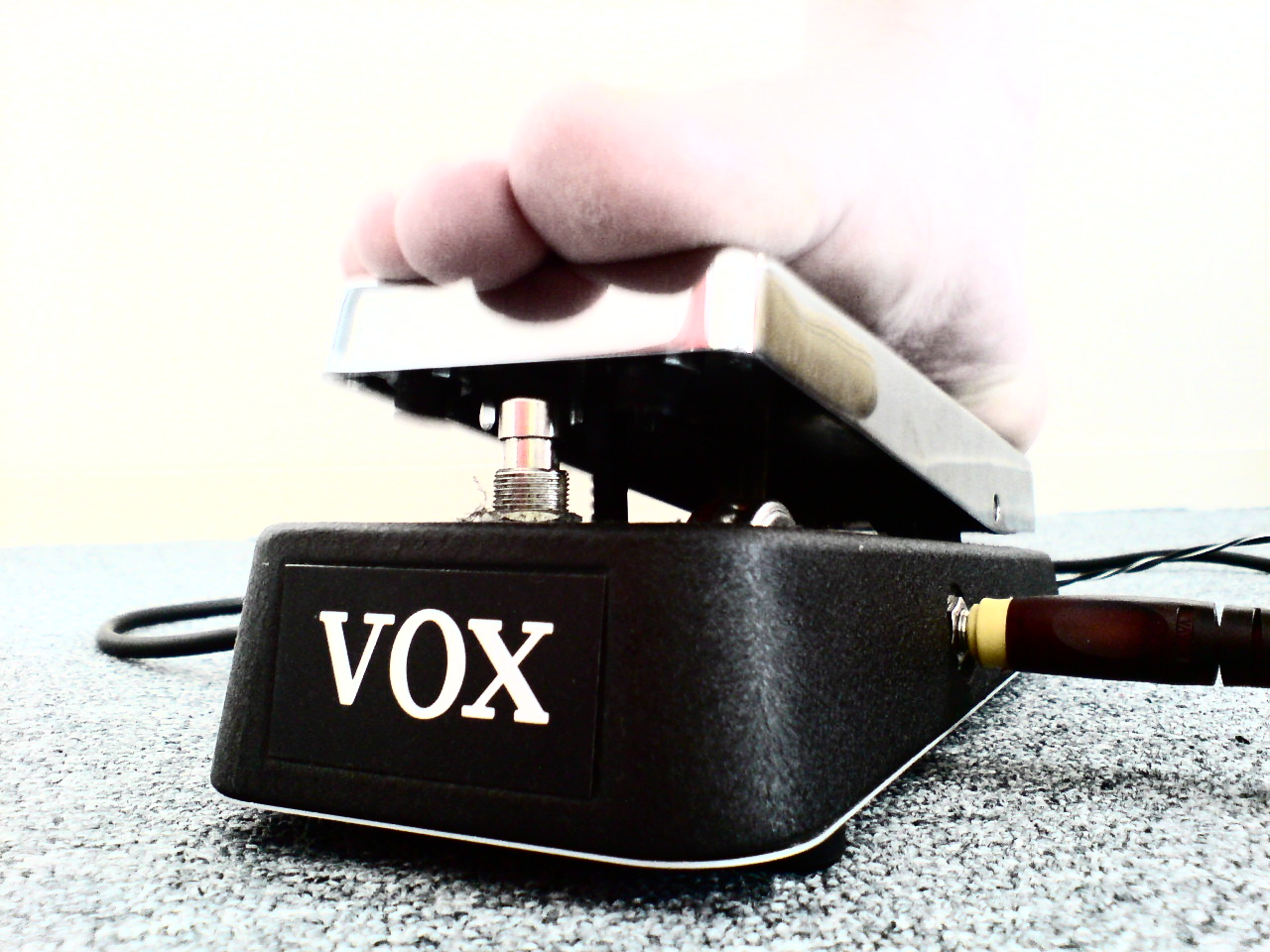
VOX wah-wah pedal

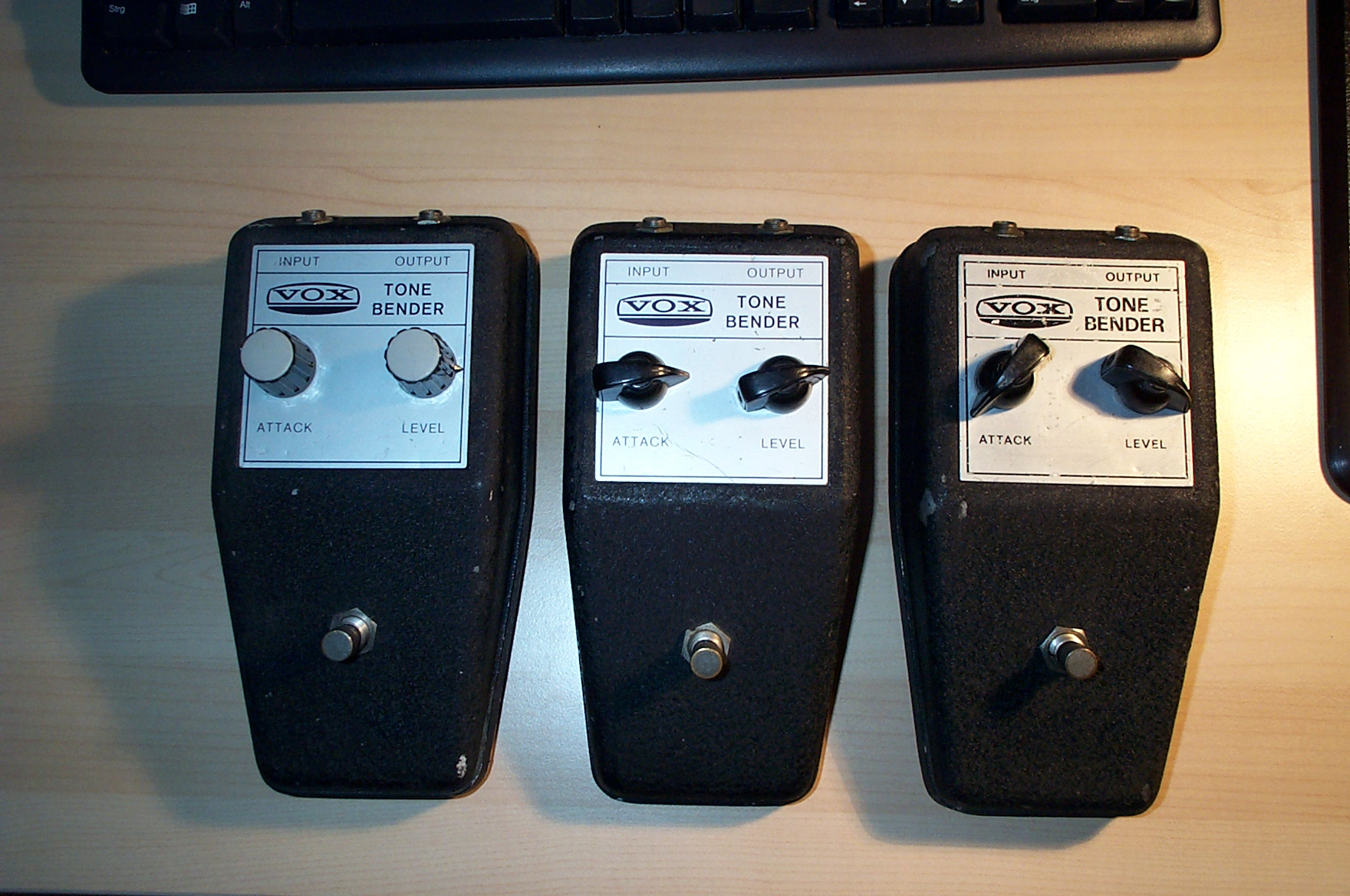
VOX Tone Bender

Guitar pedals and other effects, including an early version of the wah-wah pedal used by Jimi Hendrix and the Tone Bender fuzzbox pedal, a Vox variation on the famous original Gary Hurst Tone Bender (used by Jimmy Page of Led Zeppelin and Jeff Beck of the Yardbirds as well as The Beatles, Spencer Davis and others), were also marketed by Vox and later on manufactured in Italy.

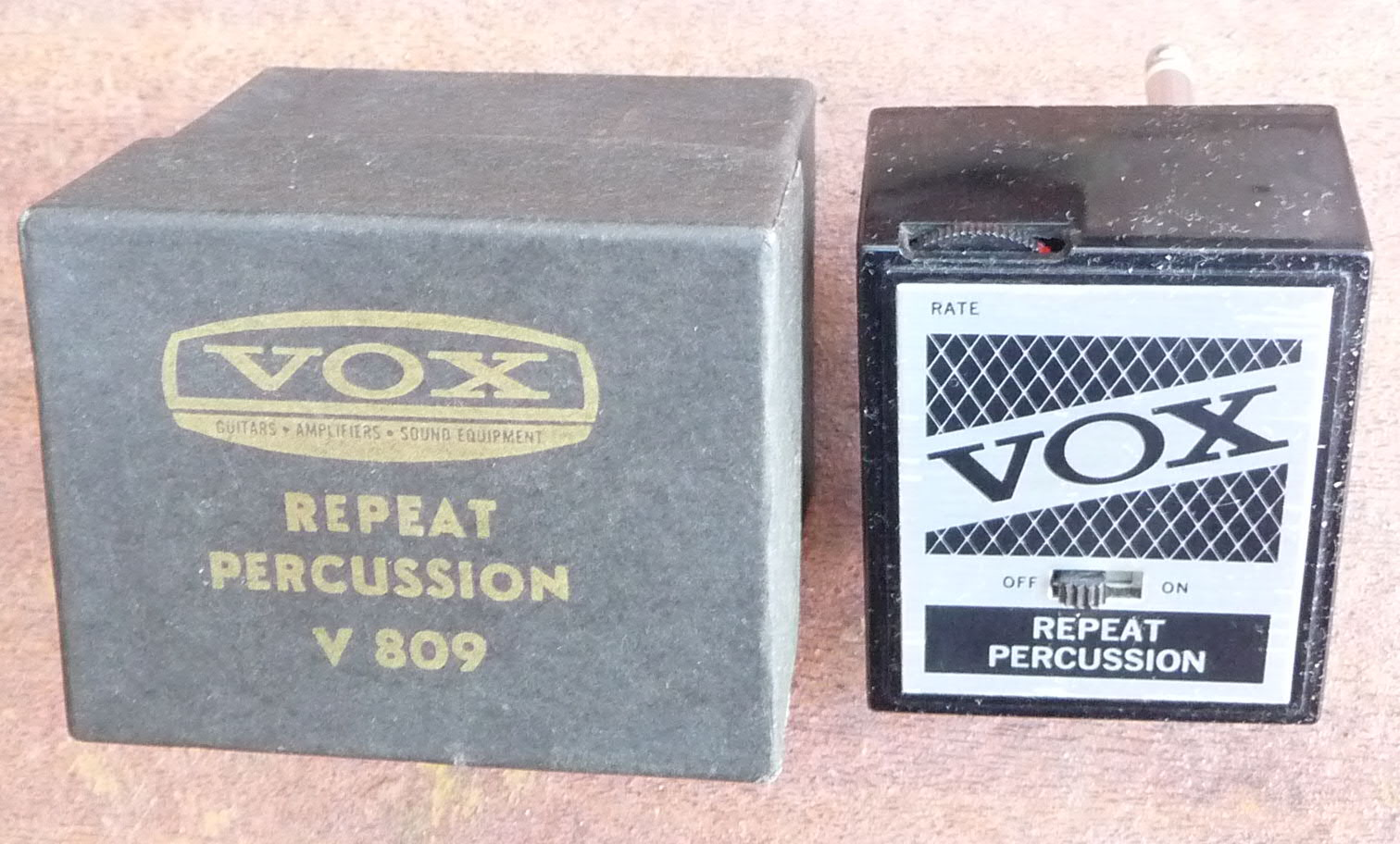
Vox V 809 Repeat Percussion effect operated by PP3 9 volt battery, direct plug-in or by in-line cable

In 1967, Vox introduced a series of guitars which featured built in effects such as Distortion (fuzz tone), Repeat Percussion (percussive tremolo), Treble/Bass Booster and a wah-wah operated by the heel of the picking hand pushing on a spring-loaded lever over the bridge. The Delta phantom style guitar and bass, the Starstream teardrop 6-string, and Constellation teardrop bass had such effects.

Vox also pioneered the first radio microphone system, which freed singers from having their microphone connected to their amplifier or PA by a cable.

| Vox Standard 24 | Vox Virage DC |

Vox had experimented with Japanese manufacturers at the end of the sixties with the Les Paul-style VG2, and in 1982 all guitar production was moved to Japan, where the Standard & Custom 24 & 25 guitars and basses were built by Matsumoku, the makers of Aria guitars. These were generally regarded as the best quality guitars ever built under the Vox name. They were discontinued in 1985 when production was moved to Korea and they were replaced by the White Shadow models. A number of White Shadow "M"-series guitars and basses are clearly marked as "made in Japan", suggesting a phased production hand-over.

In 1998, Vox Amplification Ltd Korg reissued many of their classic Phantom and Teardrop guitars.

In March 2008, Vox unveiled the semi-hollow Virage DC (double cutaway) and SC (single cutaway) at the NAMM Show. Notable characteristics include a 3D contoured ergonomic design which not only had an arch top, but also bent back from the neck toward the base of the guitar hugging the player's body. The guitar body was milled from a single block of wood and had a fitted face in combinations of mahogany and ash. A new triple coil pick-up system designed by DiMarzio, called the Three-90, emulates a humbucker, P-90, or single-coil tone.

In 2009, Vox refined the Virage design with the Virage II series of guitars. This series repeated the double and single cutaway bodies of the earlier Virage series, but also included the Series 77 (with double horns emulating the Gibson SG series), the Series 55 (with resemblance to the Gibson Les Paul single cutaway), and the Series 33 (with lower cost fabrication than the 77 and 55 series). The Virage II series featured CoAxe pick-ups which resembled the earlier Three-90 in functionality, but were claimed to be less noisy. The one-piece cast MaxConnect bridge of this series is aluminium and provides both a saddle and anchor for the strings.

For 2012, the VOX Phantom and Teardrop guitars appeared again as the APACHE Series travel guitars with a host of built in features including a 2-channel guitar amplifier, speakers, dozens of rhythm patterns, even a convenient E-String tuner.

In May 2013, a Vox guitar used by George Harrison and John Lennon on the Magical Mystery Tour album sold at a New York auction for 408,000 USD.

In the later years of Prince's life, he primarily utilized several versions of the Vox HDC-77 guitar, after being introduced to it by 3rdeyegirl member Ida Kristine Nielsen in the year of 2012. Some of the guitars the artist used included a Blackburst version, a White Ivory version, and a multicolored version.

==== Organs ====
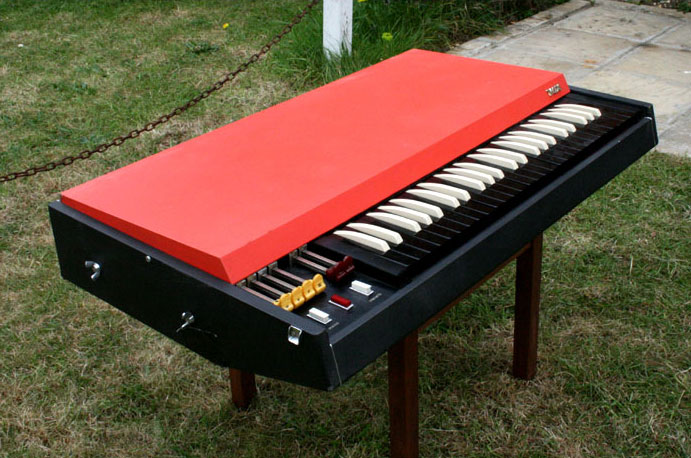
Vox Continental

The Vox brand was also applied to Jennings' electronic organs, particularly the Vox Continental of 1962, which featured drawbars and used transistors to generate sound. John Lennon played one onstage with The Beatles during "I'm Down", including at their 1965 concert at Shea Stadium, and the instrument was used by British Invasion musicians such as the Dave Clark Five's Mike Smith and the Animals' Alan Price. American Vox players include Paul Revere with Paul Revere & the Raiders and The Doors' Ray Manzarek, who used a Continental on the group's first two albums before switching to a Gibson G-101. Doug Ingle's Iron Butterfly used it on songs such as "In-A-Gadda-Da-Vida". The Continental can also be heard on the Monkees' hit "I'm a Believer" and Van Morrison's "Brown Eyed Girl".

More recently, organist Spider Webb can be seen using a Vox Continental with the UK garage band The Horrors. Benmont Tench of Tom Petty and the Heartbreakers has frequently used a Continental throughout his career.

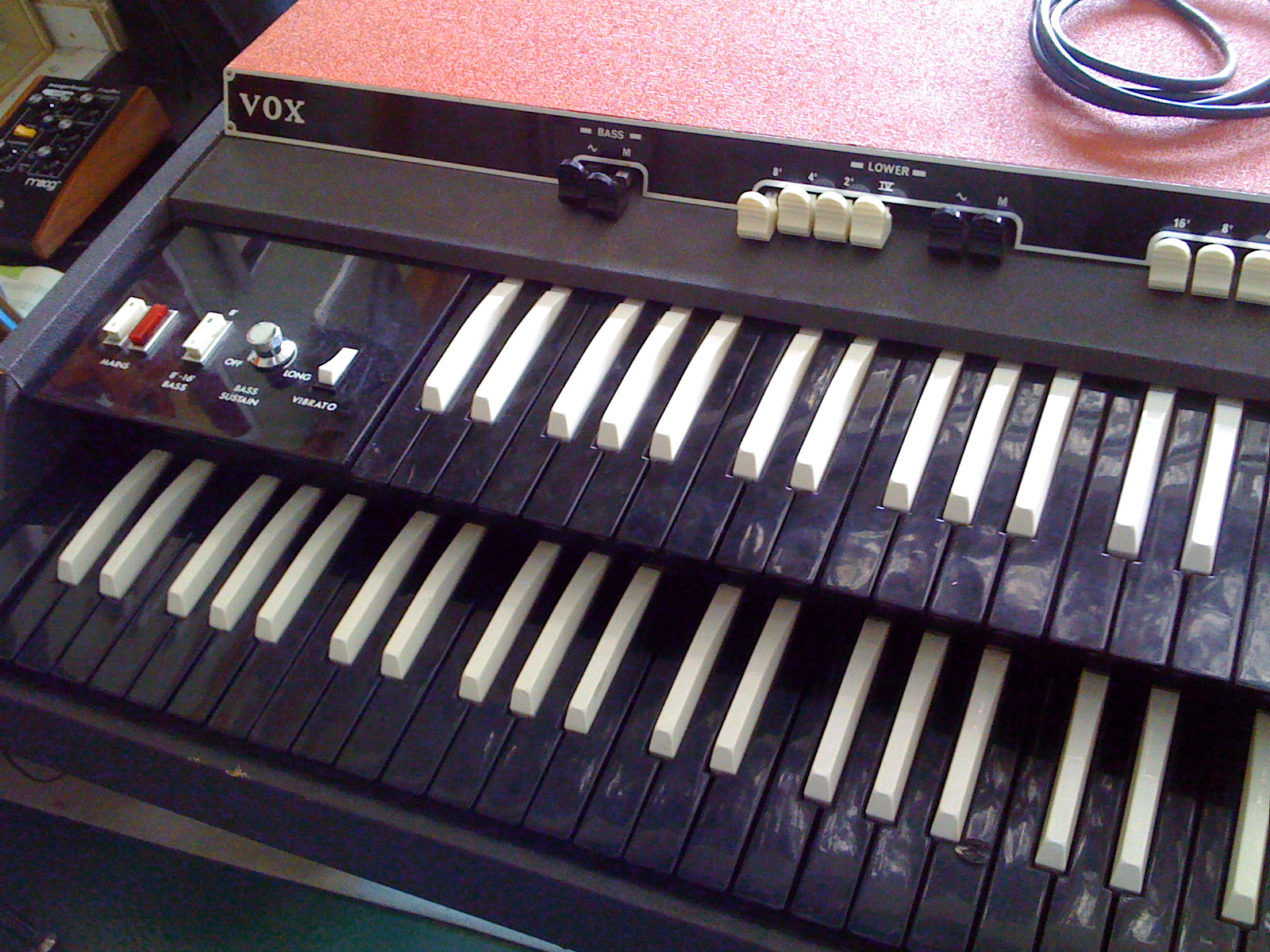
Vox Super Continental

The Continental and other Vox organs such as the Jaguar, the Continental II, Super Continental, and the Continental 300 share characteristic visual features including orange and black vinyl coverings, stands made of chromed steel tubing, and reversed black and white keys. Jennings formed a deal with the Thomas Organ Company in 1966 to manufacture Continentals in the US, with production moving to Italy the following year. The Italian Vox Continentals featured plastic keys instead of the original wooden ones, which were less reliable and broke more easily.

==== GuitarOrgan ====
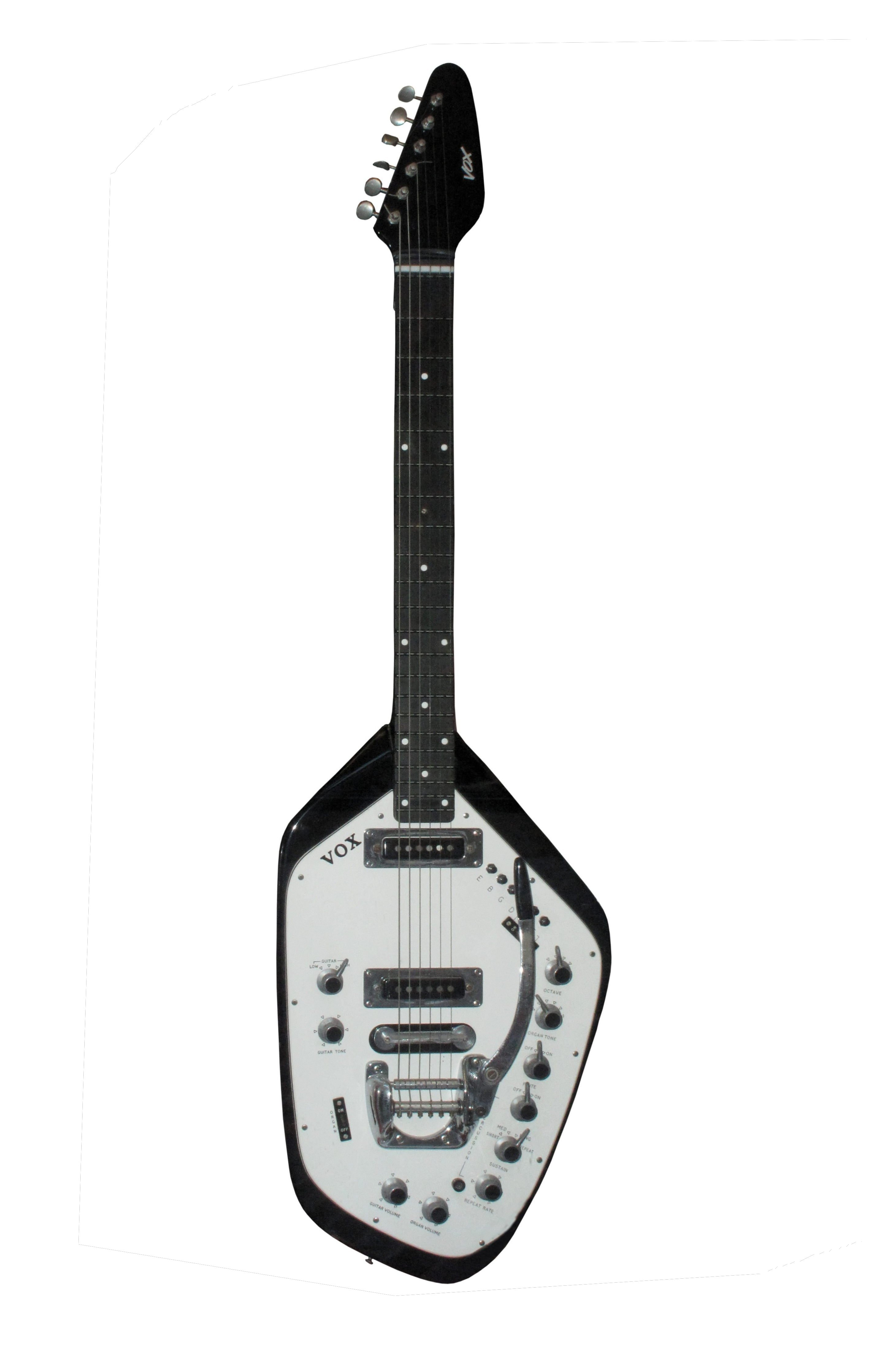
The Vox V251

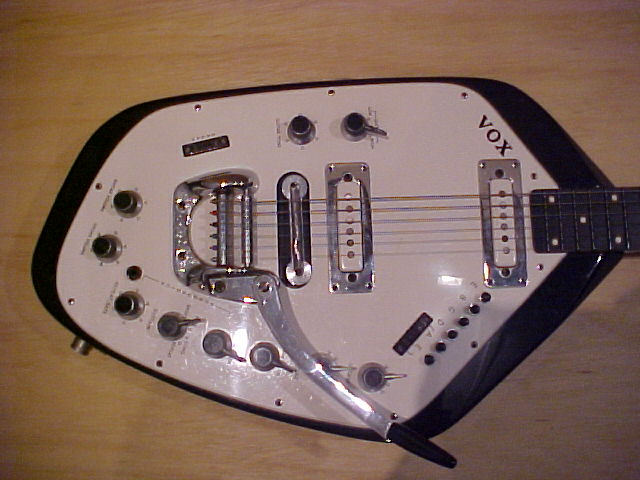
The Vox V251 GuitarOrgan

In 1966, Vox introduced the Guitar Organ, a Phantom VI guitar with internal organ electronics. John Lennon was given one in a bid to secure an endorsement, although he did not record with it.

The V251 connects to a mains power-supply unit via DIN plugs and a four-conductor cable (power, guitar output, organ output and common). The PSU in turn has individual amplifier outputs for guitar and organ.

Organ tones are sounded in one of three ways; in 'normal' mode, by pressing any string onto a fret; in 'percussion' mode, by fretting any string and touching the included brass plectrum (connected to a short wire plugged into a socket on the scratchplate) onto any metal part of the guitar; or by pressing one of the six 'open string' buttons. There is an option to silence the lowest two strings, and the organ section, as a whole, can also be switched off. There is a four-position octave selector, a six-position effect selector, a four-way selector for the percussion and a flute selector.

The guitar section is equipped with two Vox pick-ups, a three-way selector, and conventional volume and tone controls. In common with Phantom models, it has a Bigsby-style tremolo unit, a fixed-intonation bridge and individual Vox-branded tuners.

The V251 is somewhat awkward to play as the neck is wider at the nut end than at the body, and a player's natural tendency to bend a string results in it slipping off the divided fret. Additionally it is very heavy, weighing, nearly 9 lbs.

The instrument never became popular though it was a precursor to the modern guitar synthesizer. Ian Curtis of Joy Division is sometimes believed to have used a GuitarOrgan, but he actually owned two white Phantom VI special with onboard effects.

=== Expansion, transistors, and decline ===
The Vox brand grew quickly in the early 1960s, expanding along with its roster of endorsing musicians. As tube-based amps such as the AC100 were engineered with more power, they developed a reputation for overheating and malfunction. The onset of transistors pushed Vox and other manufacturers to develop solid-state amplifiers as a solution.

In 1964, Tom Jennings developed a relationship with Sepulveda, California-based Thomas Organ Company, which began importing English Vox product lines to the United States. A shift in focus to transistors came with Jennings' decision to sell controlling interest in JMI to the Royston Group, a British holding company, and move some manufacturing to Erith, Kent. The Traveller, Virtuoso, Conqueror, Defiant, Supreme, Dynamic Bass, Foundation Bass and Super Foundation Bass lines were developed and introduced during this period. Jennings remained as chief executive officer until 1969.

With assistance from Dick Denney, Thomas Organ began to produce a line of mostly solid-state amplifiers in the United States that carried the Vox brand and cosmetic stylings. First marketed in 1965, these amps effectively paralleled JMI's own transistor-based amplifiers, but differed from British and Italian made Vox in sound and reliability. To promote their line, Thomas Organ published a magazine called 'Vox Music Scene,' and built the Voxmobile, a Ford roadster dressed up to look like a Phantom guitar - complete with a Continental organ and several "Beatle" amplifiers. Despite the marketing effort, the Vox brand shed endorsees, and sales waned.

Tom Jennings set up a new company in his old Dartford location, joined later by Denney. Jennings Electronic Industries operated for several years, making an updated and rebadged version of the AC30 along with other amplifiers, as well as a new range of organs.

Royston, due to the loss of a lucrative government contract in one of its other companies, filed for bankruptcy in 1968. As a result, the Vox brand passed through a series of owners during the 1970s including a British bank and Dallas Arbiter. The AC30 continued to be built alongside newer solid-state amps, but with a series of cost-cutting measures such as loudspeakers with ceramic magnets, printed circuit boards, solid-state rectification, and particleboard cabinet construction. An all-solid-state version of the AC30 was also introduced alongside the classic, tube-powered model.

Rose Morris bought Vox in 1978 before its distribution deal with Marshall ended. The company attempted to reinvigorate the Vox brand, continuing to build the AC30 along with several new and modern amplifiers.

Korg acquired a majority stake in Rose Morris in 1992, including the Vox product lines. Korg dissolved much of the prior business before renewing the Vox brand based on its traditional strengths.

== Renewal and current products ==
Korg revived the tube rectifier and alnico speakers for their version of the AC30 in what was considered the most faithful version of the amp produced for many years. In 2005, manufacturing was moved to Vietnam, including a yet-newer redesign of the venerable AC30, designated the AC30CC, since superseded by the AC30C2.

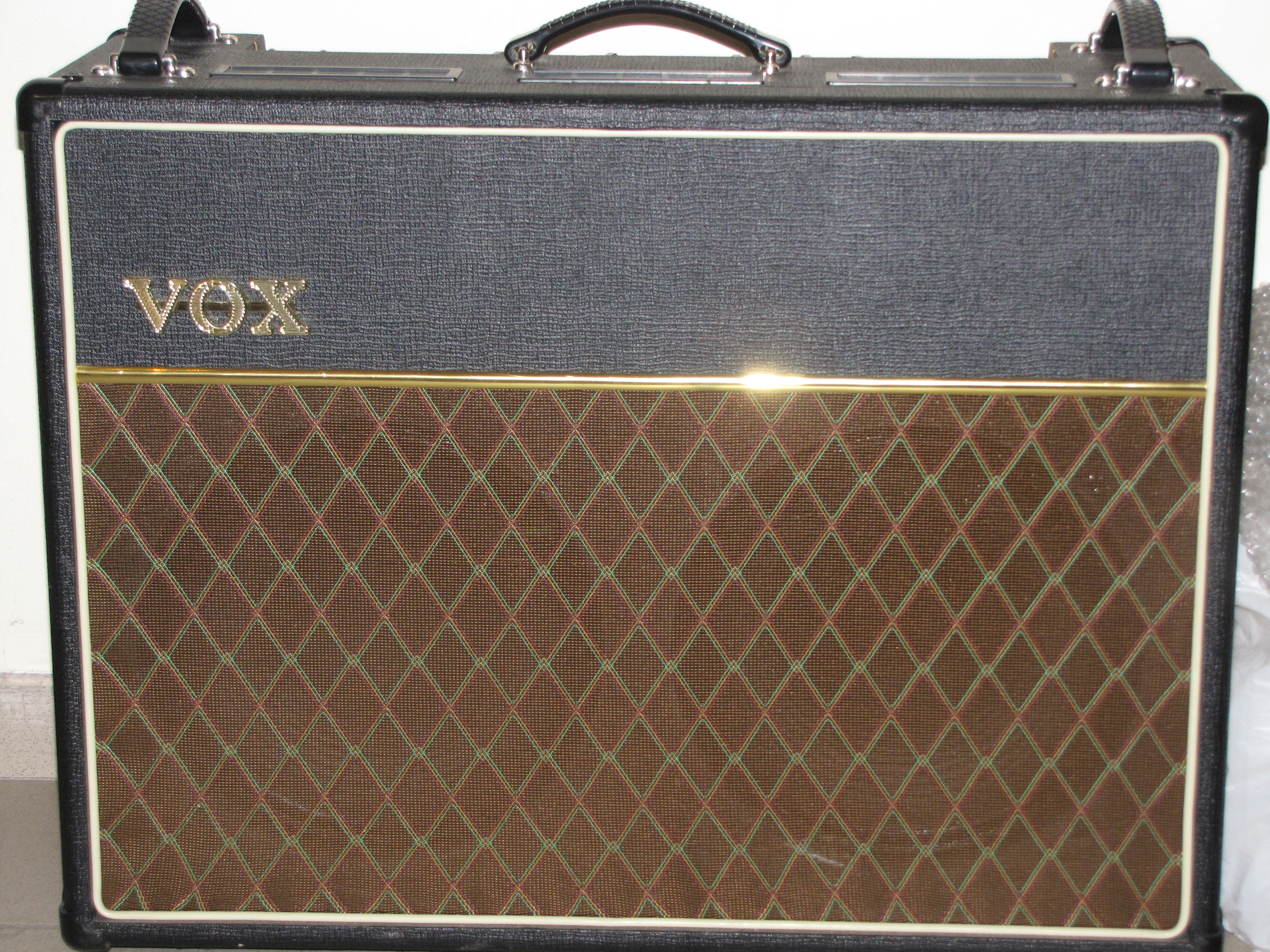
Vox AC30 CC2

A hand-wired, heritage version, the AC30H2 (and the wooden cased AC30H2L) were also produced. The AC30CC and AC15CC were later replaced with the AC30C2 and AC15C1 which had solid state rectification and a revised chassis. In 2010, Vox released a Hand-Wired version of the AC30 and AC15 with turret board construction, valve rectification and a choice of Celestion Greenback or Alnico Blue speakers.

In 2011, a hand-wired version of the AC4 was also released.

The AC10 was re-introduced in 2015 as model AC10C1.

=== Night Train ===
Vox entered the "lunchbox" amp market in 2009 with the Night Train (NT15H), an all-valve 15 W head designed with US amp designer Tony Bruno. It uses two 12AX7 preamp valves and a pair of EL84s, and can be switched between 15 W pentode and 7.5 W triode operation. Vox called it an "armored lunchbox", and reviewers compared its chrome-plated steel case to a toaster. Two more heads followed: the 2 W Lil' Night Train (NT2H) in 2010, which uses a 12AU7 dual triode for its power stage, and the 50 W Night Train 50 (NT50H) in 2011, which uses a pair of EL34s. Each has a Bright/Thick switch, and the Thick setting bypasses the tone controls for more gain. The NT50H added a second, higher-gain "Girth" channel, a Tone Cut control, a "Tight" switch that reins in the bass and a bypassable effects loop driven by an IC chip. Vox also made a matching cabinet for each head: the V112NT, V110NT and V212NT.

In 2013 Vox released "G2" versions of the 15 W and 50 W heads and added the NT15C1, the first Night Train combo. All the G2 models have three 12AX7s, Bright and Girth channels, digital reverb and an effects loop, and the NT15C1 also has a "Dark" switch that adds bass. The NT50H-G2 added an XLR DI output with speaker emulation and dropped the Tight switch and the loop bypass switch. The G2 heads have a gloss black finish in place of the chrome, and the matching V112NT-G2 and V212NT-G2 cabinets use one Celestion G12M Greenback and two Celestion G12H Anniversary speakers respectively.

In August 2014 Vox sold two limited editions through Guitar Center and Musician's Friend in the US: the NT15C1-CL, a version of the combo with Vox's traditional diamond grille cloth and a gold badge, and the NT2H-GD-SET, a matte gold Lil' Night Train head with a cabinet in diamond grille cloth and basket-weave covering.

The Night Train series was discontinued in 2017.

=== Digital modelling amplifiers ===
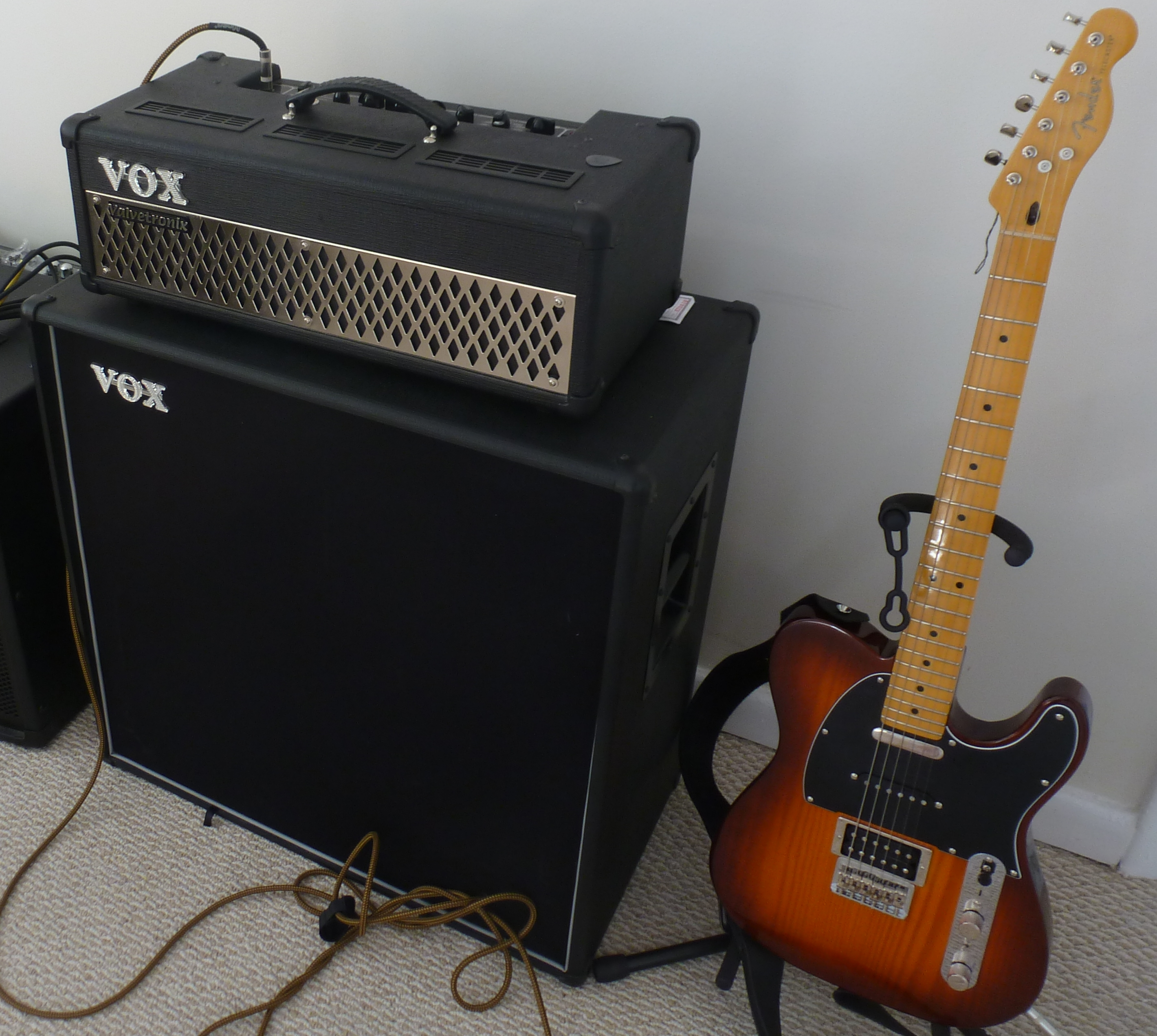
AD100VT half stack with a Fender Telecaster.

Korg introduced the Vox Valvetronix line of digital modelling amplifiers in 2001. Utilizing Korg's REMS modelling software, the blue-colored Valvetronix amps were driven via the "Valve Reactor" low-power tube preamp stage and a solid-state power amp, emulating 11 classic amplifier sounds with a variety of built-in effects (Notably, Korg did not specifically cite in the product manual which non-Vox amplifiers were modelled.):

- Boutique CL
- Black 2×12 (based on 1965 Fender Twin Reverb)
- Tweed 4×10 (based on 1959 Fender Bassman)
- AC15 (original Vox amp)
- AC30TB (original Vox amp)
- UK '70s (based on Marshall 1959 Super Lead)
- UK '80s (based on Marshall JCM 800)
- UK Modern
- US NuMetal (based on Mesa/Boogie Dual Rectifier)
- US HiGain
- US TweakGain
- Boutique O.D

The Valvetronix XL series (2007-2009) built on the concept, focused on high gain sounds designed to span the entire range of heavy rock music. With four variations, the Valvetronix XL renamed its control labels with rock-inspired descriptors:

- Glass / Funked / Buzzsaw / Crunched / Thrashed / Raged / Modern / Fluid / Molten / Black / Damaged

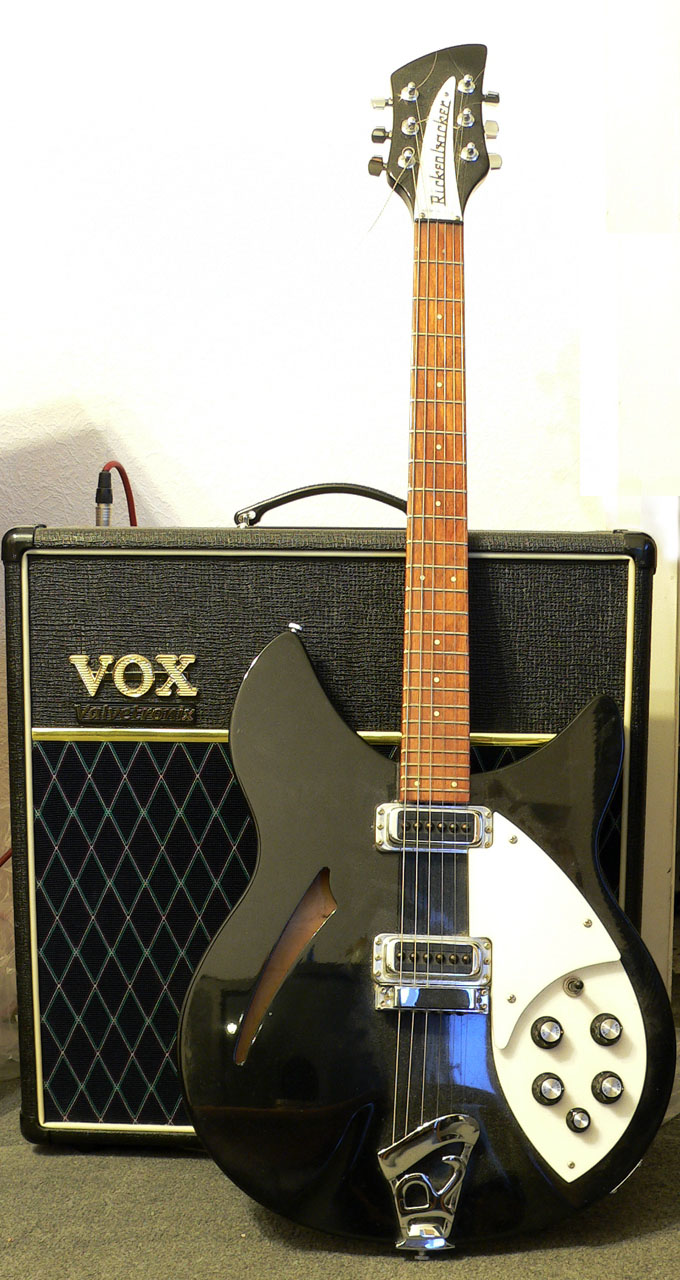
Valvetronix AD60VT with a Rickenbacker 330 JG

The entire line was refreshed in 2008 with the chrome-tinged Valvetronix VT series, including three programmable memory banks and 22 total amplifier models (in order from green to red mode):

- Boutique CL / Modded CL: Dumble Overdrive (Clean)/Fender Showman (Dumble Modded)
- Deluxe Tweed / Tweed 2X12: Fender Tweed Deluxe/Fender '57 Twin Amp
- Super 4X10 / Tweed 4X10: Fender Super Reverb/Fender Tweed Bassman
- AC15 TB / AC15: Vox AC15 (1960s Top Boost)/VOX AC15 (1950s EF86)
- AC30HH / AC30TB: Vox AC30HH / VOX AC30 Top Boost
- Express Train / Boutique OD: Trainwreck Express/Dumble Overdrive (Overdrive)
- AC50CP2 / AC30BM: Vox AC50CP2/Vox AC30BM Brian May
- UK 25TH / UK '80S: Marshall 2555 Slash Jubilee / Marshall JCM800
- US '90S / Cali Metal: Peavey 6505 / Mesa Boogie Dual Rectifier
- UK Modern / UK '90S: Marshall JVM / Marshall JCM2000
- Boutique Metal / Metal Bull: Diezel VH4 / VHT Pittbull

Korg/Vox evolved the Valvetronix line from 2010 to 2019, pushed the emulation capacity to 33 different models in the VT+ Series, added a premium VTX 150 variant with professional-grade features, and revised the modeling engine called Virtual Element Technology (VET) engineered to more accurately represent classic sounds. Vox mobile and desktop software were introduced with the 2015 VT20X and VT40X, offering players the ability to further customize sounds.

Vox modelling technology was condensed into the Vox Mini3 (sans the tube preamp) in 2010, a compact, battery-powered, portable amp with separate mic input and controls for busking.

The MV50 series of compact, hybrid amplifier heads released in 2015 were first to feature the Nutube 6P1, a long-life, dual-triode vacuum tube developed by Korg and Noritake Itron Corp. Each variant in the MV50 series emulated an individual style of classic amplifier, including Clean, AC, Rock, Boutique, and High Gain, with basic controls for Gain, Tone, and Volume.

Vox applied the Nutube hybrid approach to the lunchbox-sized VX50GTV in 2019, and the 50-watt, Celestion-backed Cambridge50 in 2020, each modelling 11 revised amplifier models:

| Control Name | Amplifier modelled |
|---|---|
| DELUXE CL | Blackface Fender Deluxe - Vibrato |
| BOUTIQUE CL | Dumble Overdrive Special - Clean |
| BOUTIQUE OD | Dumble Overdrive Special - Overdrive |
| VOX AC30 | VOX AC-30 |
| VOX AC30TB | VOX AC-30 Top Boost |
| BRIT 1959 | Marshall Super Lead Model 1959 |
| BRIT 800 | Marshall JCM800 |
| BRIT VM | Marshall JVM410H - OD2 |
| SL-OD | Soldano SLO-100 |
| DOUBLE REC | MESA/Boogie Dual Rectifier |

=== Cooltron ===
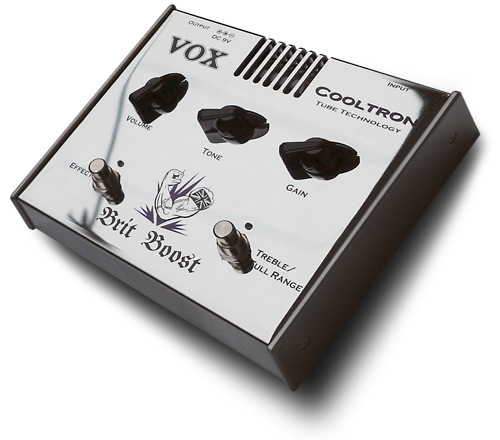
Vox Cooltron Brit Boost

Vox developed a line of analog effects pedals dubbed Cooltron, designed to offer guitarists vintage-sounding overdrive, compression, boost, distortion and tremolo. The pedals used low-power 12AU7 tubes to create vintage soft-clipping preamplification. Two of the Cooltron pedals, the Big Ben Overdrive and the Bulldog Distortion, won the Guitar World magazine Platinum Award. Cooltron pedals:

- Bulldog Distortion
- Brit Boost
- Big Ben Overdrive
- Duel Overdrive
- Over the Top Boost
- Snake Charmer Compressor
- VibraVOX

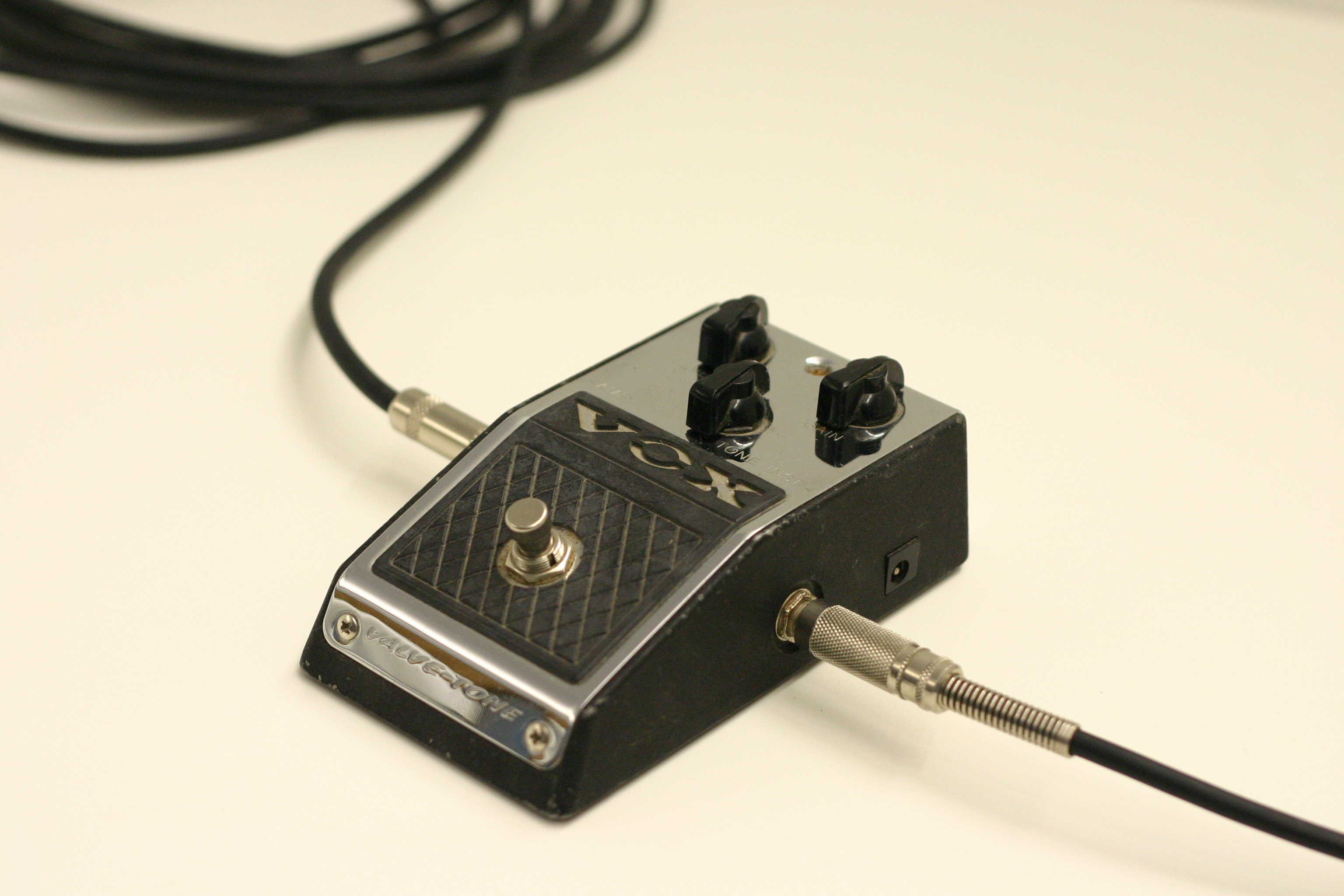
Vox Valve-tone stomp box

== See also ==
- Vintage musical equipment
- Jennings Musical Instruments
- Vox Bass Guitar

== Bibliography ==
- Hunter, Dave (16 February 2010). "50 Years of Vox". Vintage Guitar magazine. No. November 2007. (This article originally appeared in VG's November 2007 issue)
- Lenhoff, Alan; Robertson, David (2019). Classic Keys: Keyboard sounds that launched rock music. University of North Texas Press. ISBN 978-1-57441-776-0.
- Vail, Mark; Carson, Barry (2000). Vintage Synthesizers. Backbeat Books. ISBN 978-0-879-30603-8.
