= Thomas Organ Company =

American musical instrument company

- Industry: Musical instrument manufacturer
- Founded: 1875
- Products: Digital keyboards; originally a manufacturer of electronic organs for the home

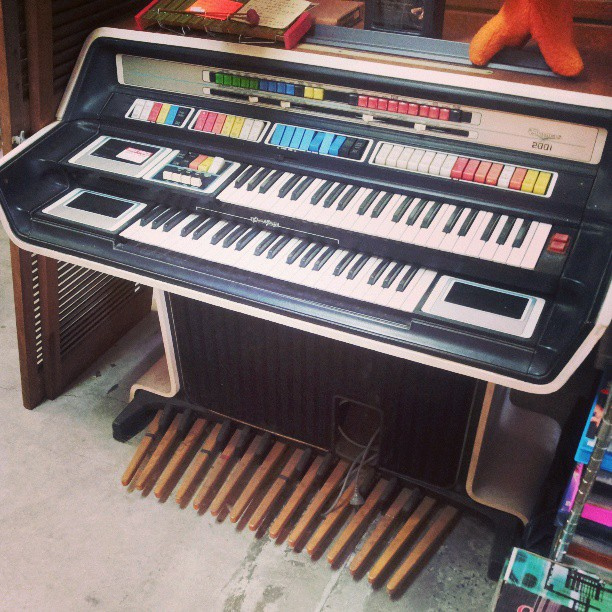
Thomas 2001 Organ (c.1976)

The Thomas Organ Company is an American manufacturer of electronic keyboards and a one-time holder of the manufacturing rights to the Moog synthesizer. The company was a force behind early electronic organs for the home. It went out of business in 1979 but reopened in 1996.

== Overview ==
=== Founding ===
Founded by Canadian Edward G. Thomas as the "Thomas Organ & Piano Co." in Woodstock, Ontario in 1875, the company's first instruments were pipe organs, moving later to pump organs. In the early 1950s, Thomas George invented the Thomas electronic organ with its single manual and ten stops. Thomas reorganized the company in 1956 into the Thomas Organ Company of Sepulveda, California.

=== Notability ===
Unlike later electronic organs with conventional tab stops, early Thomas electronic organs utilized a dial control for their stops, presumably to add a certain familiarity to its users since the dials worked much like those on a radio or television. This may be evidenced by the introduction of the Talking Organ with its "Built-In Teacher," a phonograph intended for use with instructional recordings.

=== Popularity ===
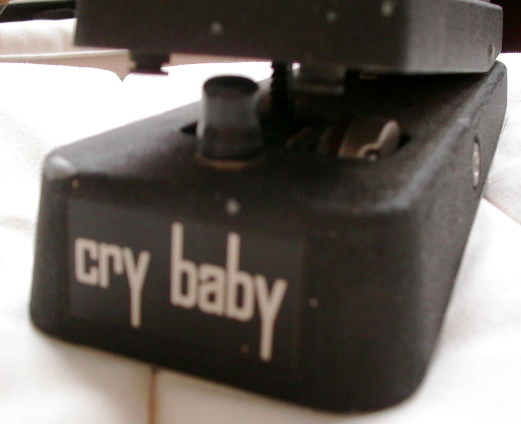
Thomas Organ Cry Baby (1970), also distributed under Vox brand

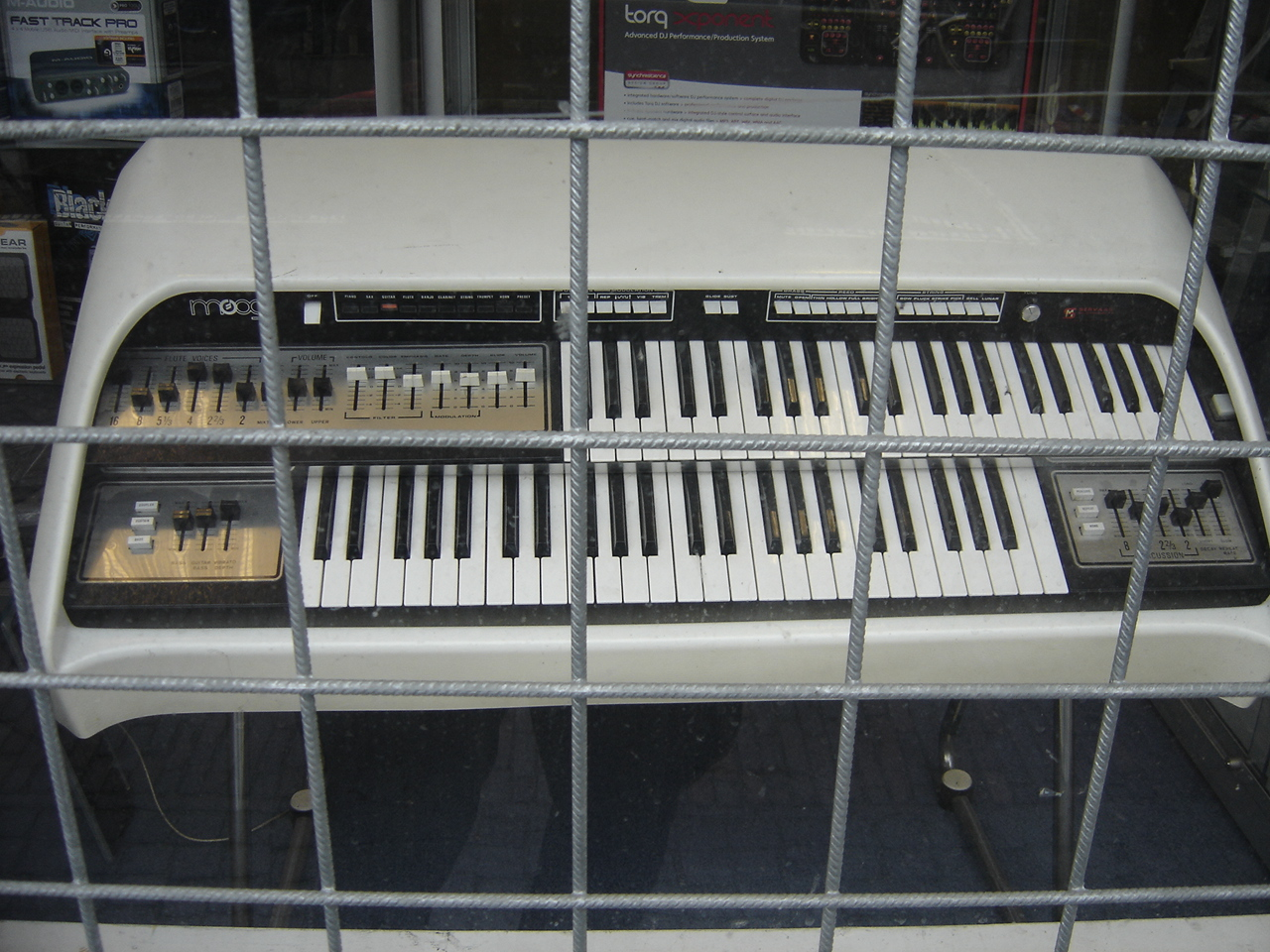
Chordovox CDX-0652 (1976) including the Moog synthesizer on upper manual, designed by Thomas, manufactured by EME.

The 1960s had the Thomas Organ Company at the height of its popularity. The company became the importer of the English-made Vox combo, the electronics of which would turn up in Thomas models. Thomas also took over manufacturing rights of the Moog synthesizer and enjoyed heavy celebrity endorsement from the likes of Lawrence Welk, whose organist Bob Ralston both played a Thomas on The Lawrence Welk Show and on tour at organ and piano shops to demonstrate the greatly improved tonal quality of the new models, and Lucille Ball, who featured a Thomas on at least one episode of The Lucy Show. Welk had a high-end model named after him in 1968, the aforementioned Lawrence Welk spinet model.

Joe Benaron was President of Thomas during its heyday. Ennio Unchini was the Italian importer.

== Features ==
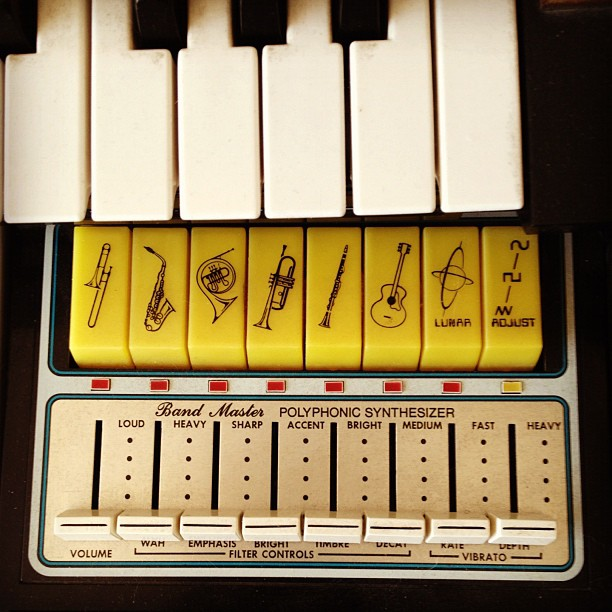
"Band Master" Polyphonic Synthesizer on Thomas 2001

Like most American furniture of the 1950s, early electronic organs were massive affairs; indeed, the company's largest market was the home market. Thomas' introduction of the "streamlined" console and the introduction of solid state electronics made Thomas the preeminent manufacturer of home organs. That latter introduction to the Thomas line led to developments much like those found of synthesizers of later years; one later version, the 1973 Monticello, actually incorporated a synthesizer in its upper manual which actually was a Moog synthesizer. It was found on the MONTICELLO Models 371 & 372 and on the CELEBRITY Model 871.

- Repeat Percussion - Playable from either manual, Repeat Percussion emulated the sound of percussive instruments such as a marimba or banjo. The repeat rate was easily adjusted via a thumbwheel on most models and rotary control on smaller models such as the AR1
- Vibra-Magic - This innovative feature allowed sustained notes to have gradual vibrato added, again at a setting that could be determined by the organist. Other makers soon followed, giving their variations the more generic name of "delayed vibrato" or similar name
- Leslie speaker - This rapidly spinning speaker, located in its own cabinet within the organ's console, added depth to the otherwise relatively flat sounds generated by the oscillators. Leslie speakers were not an invention of Thomas but were certainly used by them.
- Band Box - This predecessor to the modern drum machine recreated rhythms from a simple foxtrot to a bossa nova, with individual percussion instruments added by the organist via rocker switches. These individual instruments had the aforementioned Repeat Percussion feature allowing the sound of a drum roll or maracas. They also had their own individual triggers, allowing the organist to recreate rimshots, cymbal crashes and even the pop and fizz of a champagne bottle either via buttons on the control panel, at the lower manual or at the pedal board

=== Color-Glo system ===
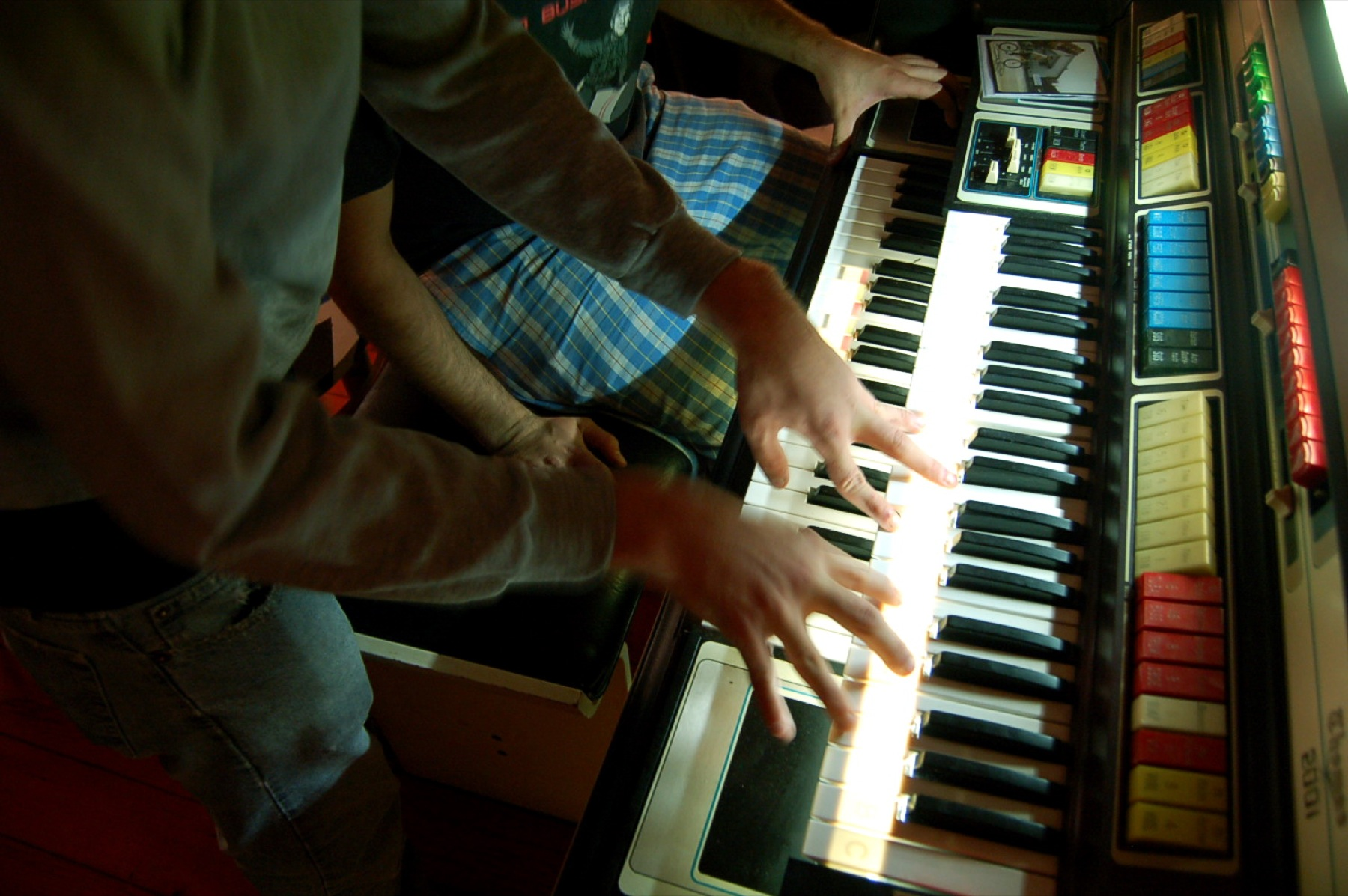
Thomas 2001 playing

Another innovation during its heyday was Color-Glo, an instructional system which illuminated the keys of the manuals (and therefore their corresponding notes in reverse relief) from behind with fluorescent lights. The lower manual had black, green, and red colored bands behind the notes necessary to play a second-inversion C, a first-inversion F and a root-position G. The C, F and G pedals had colored bands across their tips corresponding to the chords. The idea was that a rank beginner could create music simply by following the very simple music books that featured lettered noteheads and color-coded chords. "Matching the colors" was sufficient to play full-sounding four-voice chords.

Thomas's three-volume course Color-Glo Plus: A Sound For Everyone introduced "three simple rules" that allowed for more chords, by changing the pedal notes and/or specifying a manual note to raise or lower. The chord's letter name indicated the pedal to play, while as before, the color-coding specified the basic C, F, or G chord shape on the lower manual. Note name stickers were provided for the pedals. These extended rules allowed for chords such as (black) Am7, +A7, and ^{−}Cm; (green) Dm7, ^{+}D7, and _{−}Fm; and (red) Em7, _{+}E7, and -Gm. The height of any + or - before the chord symbol showed which note to raise or lower.

== Product lines ==
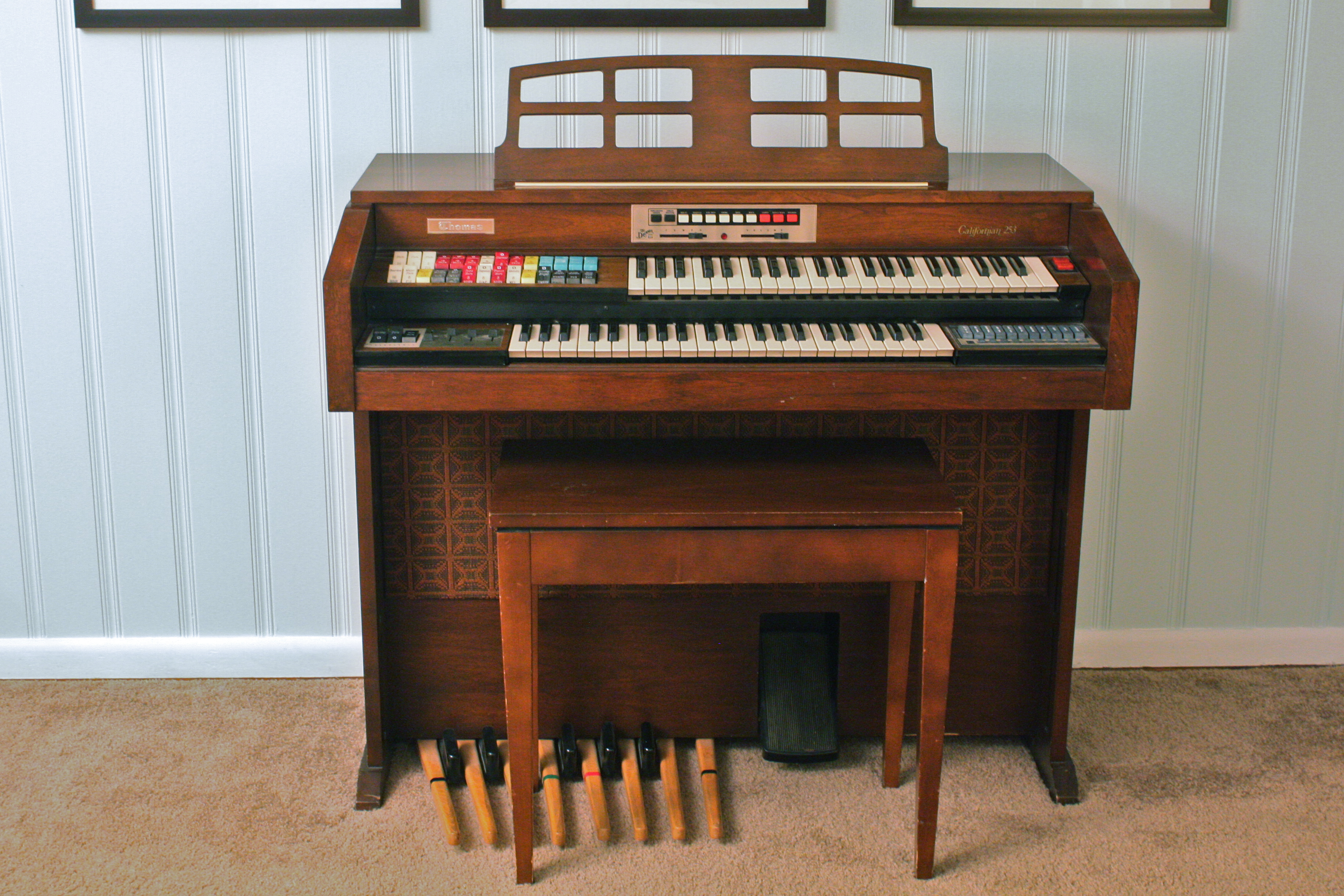
Thomas Californian 253 (c.1971)

These features and others were incorporated across the product line throughout the 1960s, including small, relatively inexpensive spinet models with 37-note manuals (the AR1) and a unique "arc" 13-note pedal board, another Thomas Organ innovation, although one which was too narrow to allow true heel-toe playing. Thomas however did lengthen the pedals to enable theoretically at least heel and toe playing. Especially remarkable was that the spinets started around US$500. Larger models included the Concert Serenade and the Lawrence Welk, each with two 44-note manuals and a 25-note pedal board. Larger still were the Celebrity with two 61-note manuals and a 32-note pedal board (revised to a 25-note version in later editions), the American Guild of Organists-compliant Impresario theatre organ, the Model 710 church organ and the Model 900-series 3-manual theatre organ.

Popular kit versions were made available via Heathkit and fully assembled versions under the Silvertone brand were sold by Sears, Roebuck and Company.
