= Thomas Walter Jennings =

- Born: 28 February 1917; Hackney, London, England
- Died: 1978 (aged 60); London, England
- Occupations: Music company founder, musical engineer
- Known for: Founder of Jennings Musical Instruments

Thomas Walter Jennings (28 February 1917 – 1978) was an English businessman who was the founder of Jennings Organ Company. In 1950 he formed Jennings Musical Instruments (JMI) Ltd, the company that produced the famous Vox Guitar amplifiers. In 1956 the company name was changed to Jennings Musical Industries Ltd. Disenchanted with the company direction, he left JMI Ltd in 1967 and set up a separate company, Jennings Electronic Industries.

== Biography ==
Jennings was born in Hackney, London, England on 28 February 1917. He became an accomplished amateur accordion player. He served with the Royal Electrical and Mechanical Engineers during World War II, but he was discharged from the Army on medical grounds in 1942. Jennings then worked at the Vickers munitions plant in Kent. There he met amateur guitarist Dick Denney who played with a local big band. On occasion, the two played together, but not professionally. Denny also had an interest in electronics and radio technology.

In 1944, Jennings started repairing accordions and trading in second hand musical instruments part-time at first. In 1946, Jennings set up his first shop in Dartford, Kent and began importing accordions and other musical instruments. He also invented new products, the first being the Univox electronic organ, which was a huge success, and not only inspired the "Vox" brand name but was the springboard for his musical instrument amplifier manufacturing empire.

During the early 1950s, Jennings focused mainly on keyboards; he attempted to modify organ amplifiers for electric guitars, but had little success. Dick Denney, was also experimenting with guitar amplification and succeeded in producing a 15 watt amplifier paired with a 12-inch (300 mm) speaker. After adding a tremolo unit, he made two more prototypes, one of which was shown to Jennings. Jennings offered Denney a job with his company, now named Jennings Musical Instruments (JMI). Denney accepted the position of engineer and further developed his prototype. In 1957 JMI launched the short-lived AC2/30, the first guitar amplifier to be branded Vox, but it was the AC/15 guitar amplifier, launched in January 1958, that made the Vox brand name world-famous.

Displeased with the direction his old company was taking, Tom Jennings left JMI in 1967, roughly the same time that Marshall overtook Vox as the dominant force in the British guitar amplifier market. He set up a new company, Jennings Electronic Industries (JEI), in his old Dartford location. Later, Dick Denney joined the new company which operated for several years, making an updated and rebadged version of the AC30 with , along with other amplifiers and a new range of organs. Jennings died in London in 1978 at the age of 60.

Following the establishment of Jennings Electronic Industries (JEI) in Dartford, Michael Edward Huckle played a key role in the development of an updated version of the AC30 amplifier. With a background in electronic engineering, Huckle contributed to the design improvements and production of JEI’s amplifier range. Under his leadership, the company modernized the AC30 while maintaining its signature tone, ensuring its continued popularity among musicians. Dick Denney later joined JEI, and together they expanded the product line to include additional amplifiers and a new range of organs.
