= Cathode bias =

Vacuum tube circuit design technique

In electronics, cathode bias, also known as self-bias, or automatic bias, is a technique used with vacuum tubes to make the direct current (dc) cathode voltage positive in relation to the negative side of the plate voltage supply by an amount equal to the magnitude of the desired grid bias voltage.

== Operation ==
The most common cathode bias implementation passes the cathode current through a resistor connected between the cathode and the negative side of the plate voltage supply. The cathode current through this resistor causes the desired voltage drop across the resistor and places the cathode at a positive dc voltage equal in magnitude to the negative grid bias voltage required. The grid circuit puts the grid at zero volts dc relative to negative side of the plate voltage supply, causing the grid voltage to be negative with respect to the cathode by the required amount. Directly heated cathode circuits connect the cathode bias resistor to the center tap of the filament transformer secondary or to the center tap of a low resistance connected across the filament.

== Design ==
To find the correct resistor value, first the tube operating point is determined. The plate current, the grid voltage relative to the cathode and the screen current (if applicable) are noted for the operating point. The cathode bias resistor value is found by dividing the absolute value of the operating point grid voltage by the operating point cathode current (plate current plus screen current). The power dissipated by the cathode bias resistor is the product of the square of the cathode current and the resistance in ohms.

Any signal frequency effect of the cathode resistor may be minimized by providing a suitable bypass capacitor in parallel with the resistor. In general, the capacitor value is selected such that the time constant of the capacitor and bias resistor is an order of magnitude greater than the period of the lowest frequency to be amplified. The capacitor makes the gain of the stage, at the signal frequencies, essentially the same as if the cathode was connected directly to the circuit return.

In some designs, the degenerative (negative) feedback caused by the cathode resistor may be desirable. In this case, all or a portion of the cathode resistance is not bypassed by a capacitor.

In class A push-pull circuits a pair of tubes driven by identical signals 180 degrees out of phase may share a common unbypassed cathode resistor. Degeneration will not occur because, if the grid voltage versus plate current characteristics of the two tubes are matched, the current through the cathode resistor will not vary during the 360 degrees of the signal cycle.

== Application considerations ==
- The voltage gain of the stage is reduced by the cathode resistor. The cathode resistor appears in series with the plate load impedance in the voltage gain equation.
- Local negative feedback (cathode degeneration) is caused by the cathode resistor.
- The "B" or plate supply voltage available to the tube is, in effect, reduced by the magnitude of the bias voltage.

== Comparison with fixed bias ==
Cathode bias, as a solution, is often the alternative to using fixed bias. Robert Tomer, in his 1960 book about vacuum tubes, which mainly concerned itself with strategies for improving tube lifespan, condemned fixed bias designs in favor of cathode bias. He said that fixed bias, unlike cathode bias, does not provide a margin for error that protects the system from inevitable differences between vacuum tubes nor does it protect against run-away conditions caused by tube or circuit malfunctions. He also asserted that most tube specialists consider fixed bias operation to be dangerous. Despite this stance, fixed bias is commonly used in tube amplifiers today. Tomer identified the trend toward fixed bias designs in 1960 but was not certain about the reasons for it.

== See also ==
- Biasing
