= Rexine =

Type of artificial leather

Rexine is an artificial leather leathercloth fabric formerly produced in the United Kingdom by Rexine Ltd of Hyde, near Manchester, England. A registered trademark, it is composed of cloth surfaced with a mixture of cellulose nitrate (a low explosive also used as the propellant in firearms rounds), camphor oil, pigment and alcohol, embossed to look like leather. Rexine was discontinued in 2005, but similar leathercloth fabrics continue to be produced by multiple manufacturers, including the original manufacturer.

Used as a bookbinding material and upholstery covering, Rexine was also widely used in trimming and upholstering the interiors of motor vehicles produced by British car manufacturers beginning in the 1920s, and the interiors of railway carriages, its cost being around a quarter that of leather. It was used by the British Motor Corporation in the 1960s and 1970s, particularly as a surface for 'crash padding' on dashboards and doors. It was also used for British teddy bear paw and foot pads from the late 1930s to early 1960s.

The author George Orwell, writing in his wartime diary on 29 April 1942, reported on his visit to the British House of Lords: "Everything had a somewhat mangy look. Red rexine cushions on the benches - I could swear they used to be red plush at one time."

The use of rexine in the upholstery of a railway carriage contributed to the rapid spread of fire on the 15:48 West Riding express from King's Cross, near Huntingdon, on 14 July 1951.
