= History of the LED =

History of semiconductor light source

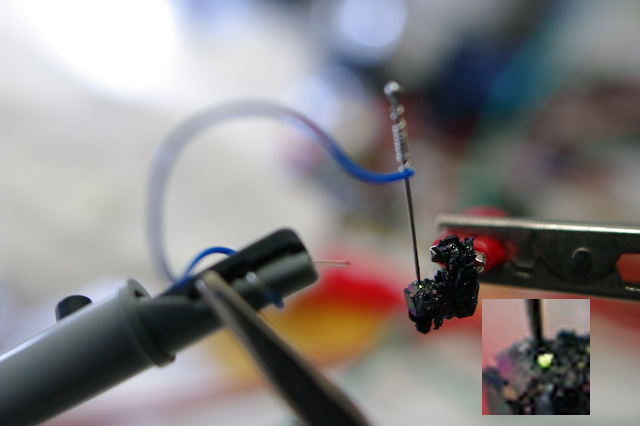
Green electroluminescence from a point contact on a crystal of SiC recreates Round's original experiment from 1907.

The history of the light-emitting diode begins with the 1906 discovery of electroluminescence from a solid state diode by Henry Joseph Round. In 1927, Russian inventor Oleg Losev created the first LED. The first practical LED was developed in 1961 by researchers at Texas Instruments. The 1970s saw the first commercial LEDs. In the early 1990s, Shuji Nakamura, Hiroshi Amano and Isamu Akasaki invented blue LEDs that were dramatically more efficient than their predecessors, bringing a new generation of bright, energy-efficient white lighting and full-color LED displays into practical use, work that won them the 2014 Nobel Prize in Physics.

== Early experiments ==
Henry Joseph Round, of Marconi Labs, made his discovery in 1906 while using a cat's-whisker detector and passing current through combinations of carborundum (silicon carbide) crystal. He noticed that some gave off light – the first known report of the effect of the light-emitting diode (LED).

Round published his result in 1907 in Electrical World:

To the Editors of Electrical World:

SIRS: – During an investigation of the unsymmetrical passage of current through a contact of carborundum and other substances, a curious phenomenon was noted. On applying a potential of 10 volts between two points on a crystal of carborundum, the crystal gave out a yellowish light. Only one or two specimens could be found, which gave a bright glow on such a low voltage, but with 110 volts, a large number could be found to glow. In some crystals, only edges gave the light, and others gave instead of a yellow light green, orange, or blue. In all cases tested, the glow appears to come from the negative pole, a bright blue-green spark appearing at the positive pole. In a single crystal, if contact is made near the center with the negative pole, and the positive pole is put in contact at any other place, only one section of the crystal will glow, and that same section, wherever the positive pole is placed.

There seems to be some connection between the above effect and the e.m.f. produced by a junction of carborundum and another conductor when heated by a direct or alternating current, but the connection may be only secondary as an obvious explanation of the e.m.f. effect is the thermoelectric one. The writer would be glad of references to any published account of an investigation of this or any allied phenomena.

New York, N. Y.

H. J. Round

A light-emitting diode was created, in 1927, by Russian inventor Oleg Losev, that also used silicon carbide as a semiconductor. Despite having distributed his report in Soviet, German and British scientific journals, Losev's LED found no practical use for several decades, partly due to the very inefficient light-producing properties of the semiconductor used.

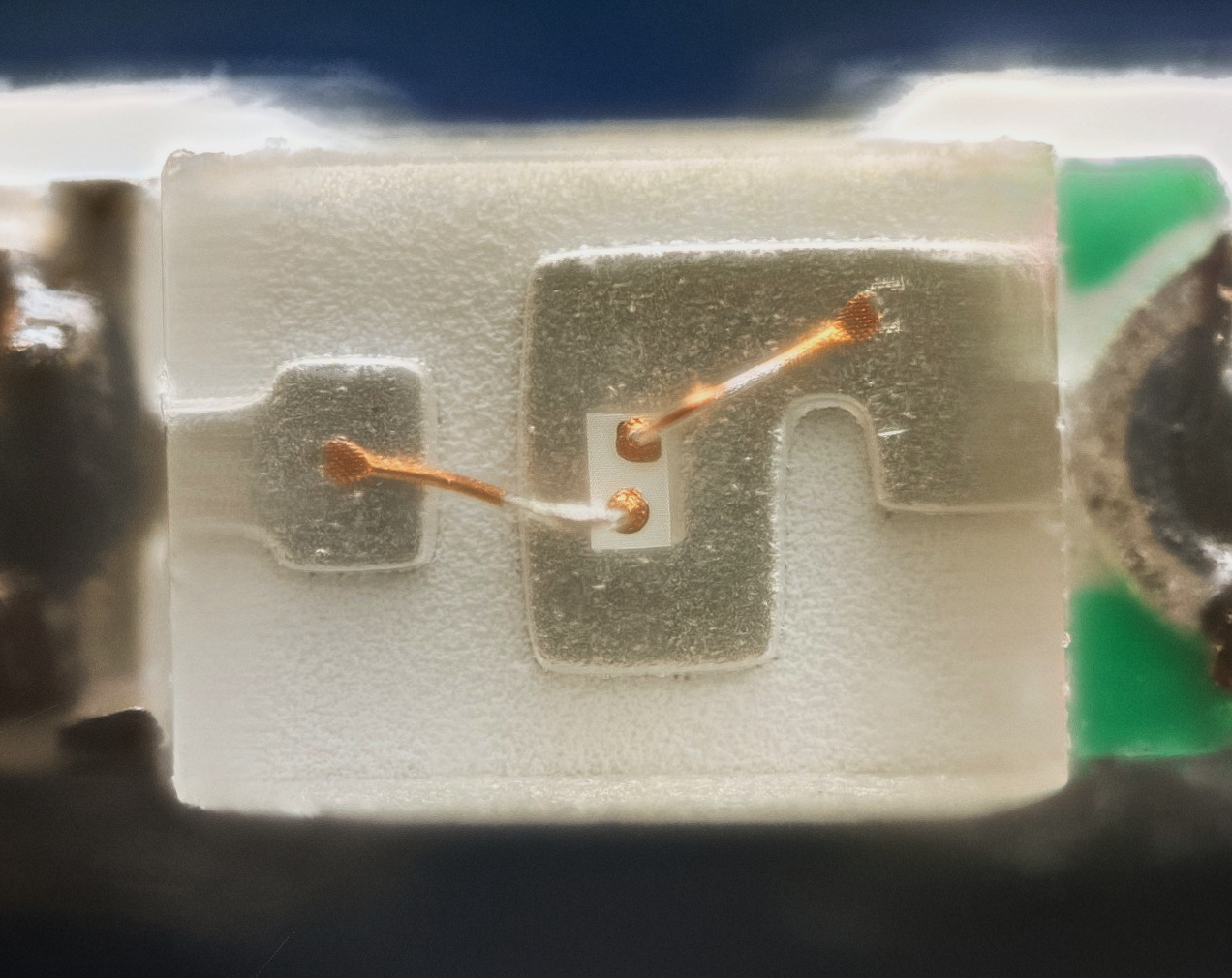
0603 SMD (Surface Mount Device) package LED

In 1936, Georges Destriau observed that electroluminescence could be produced when zinc sulphide (ZnS) powder is suspended in an insulator and an alternating electrical field is applied to it. In his publications, Destriau often referred to luminescence as Losev-Light. Destriau worked in the laboratories of Madame Marie Curie, also an early pioneer in the field of luminescence with research on radium.

Hungarian Zoltán Bay together with György Szigeti patenting a lighting device in Hungary in 1939 based on silicon carbide, with an option on boron carbide, that emitted white, yellowish white, or greenish white depending on impurities present. Kurt Lehovec, Carl Accardo, and Edward Jamgochian explained these first LEDs in 1951 using an apparatus employing SiC crystals with a current source of a battery or a pulse generator and with a comparison to a variant, pure, crystal in 1953.

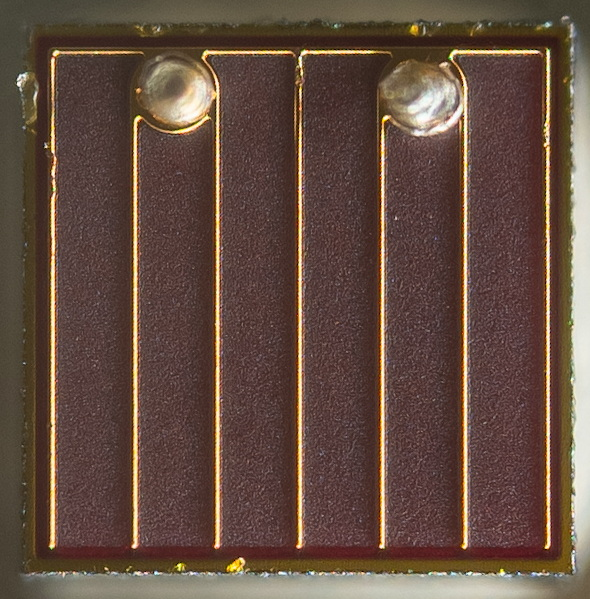
Close-up of a 1 watt red power led

Rubin Braunstein of the Radio Corporation of America reported on infrared emission from gallium arsenide (GaAs) and other semiconductor alloys in 1955. Braunstein observed infrared emission generated by simple diode structures using gallium antimonide (GaSb), GaAs, indium phosphide (InP), and silicon-germanium (SiGe) alloys at room temperature and at 77K. In 1957, Braunstein further demonstrated that the rudimentary devices could be used for non-radio communication across a short distance. As noted by Kroemer Braunstein "...had set up a simple optical communications link: Music emerging from a record player was used via suitable electronics to modulate the forward current of a GaAs diode. The emitted light was detected by a PbS diode some distance away. This signal was fed into an audio amplifier and played back by a loudspeaker. Intercepting the beam stopped the music. We had a great deal of fun playing with this setup."

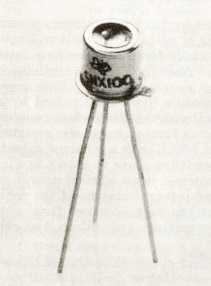
A 1962 Texas Instruments SNX-100 GaAs LED contained in a TO-18 transistor metal case

In September 1961, while working at Texas Instruments in Dallas, Texas, James R. Biard and Gary Pittman discovered near-infrared (900 nm) light emission from a tunnel diode they had constructed on a GaAs substrate. By October 1961, they had demonstrated efficient light emission and signal coupling between a GaAs p-n junction light emitter and an electrically isolated semiconductor photodetector. On August 8, 1962, Biard and Pittman filed a patent titled "Semiconductor Radiant Diode" based on their findings, which described a zinc-diffused p–n junction LED with a spaced cathode contact to allow for efficient emission of infrared light under forward bias.

After establishing the priority of their work based on engineering notebooks predating submissions from G.E. Labs, RCA Research Labs, IBM Research Labs, Bell Labs, and Lincoln Lab at MIT, the U.S. patent office issued the two inventors the patent for the GaAs infrared light-emitting diode (U.S. Patent US3293513), the first practical LED. Immediately after filing the patent, Texas Instruments (TI) began a project to manufacture infrared diodes. In October 1962, TI announced the first commercial LED product (the SNX-100), which employed a pure GaAs crystal to emit an 890 nm light output. In October 1963, TI announced the first commercial hemispherical LED, the SNX-110.

In the 1960s, several laboratories focused on LEDs that would emit visible light. A particularly important device was demonstrated by Nick Holonyak on October 9, 1962, while he was working for General Electric in Syracuse, New York. The device used the semiconducting alloy gallium phosphide arsenide (GaAsP). It was the first semiconductor laser to emit visible light, albeit at low temperatures. At room temperature it still functioned as a red light-emitting diode. GaAsP was the basis for the first wave of commercial LEDs emitting visible light. It was mass-produced by the Monsanto and Hewlett-Packard companies and used widely for displays in calculators and wrist watches.

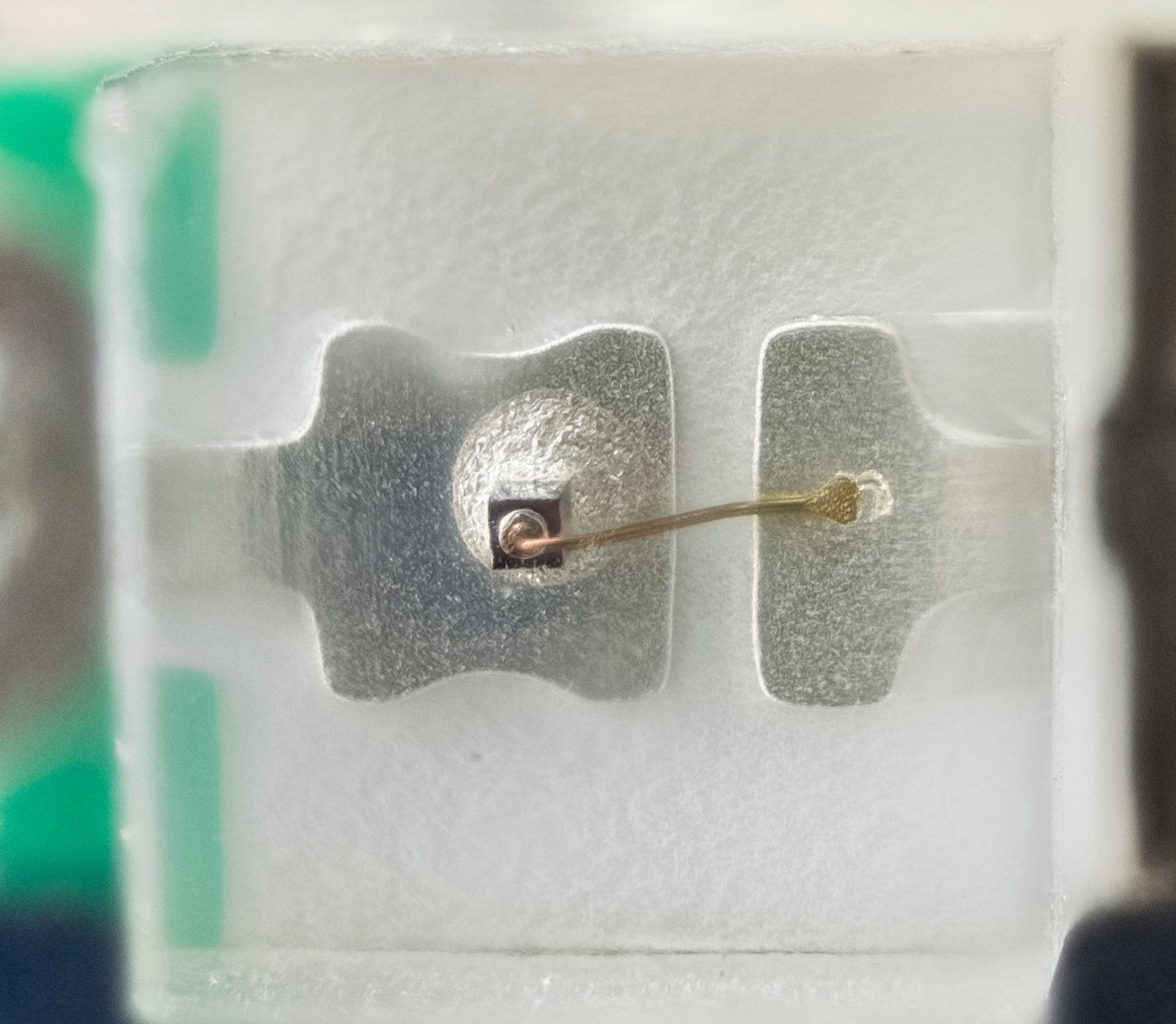
0603 SMD (Surface Mount Device) package red LED

M. George Craford, a former graduate student of Holonyak, invented the first yellow LED and improved the brightness of red and red-orange LEDs by a factor of ten in 1972. In 1976, T. P. Pearsall designed the first high-brightness, high-efficiency LEDs for optical fiber telecommunications by inventing new semiconductor materials specifically adapted to optical fiber transmission wavelengths.

In the early 1990s, Shuji Nakamura, Hiroshi Amano and Isamu Akasaki invented blue light-emitting diodes that were dramatically more efficient than their predecessors, bringing a new generation of bright, energy-efficient white lighting and full-color LED displays into practical use and winning the 2014 Nobel Prize in Physics. Shuji Nakamura is credited as the researcher who invented the LEDs and his research was expanded on by Hiroshi Amano and Isamu Akasaki who solved two of the three main problems in creating blue LEDs.

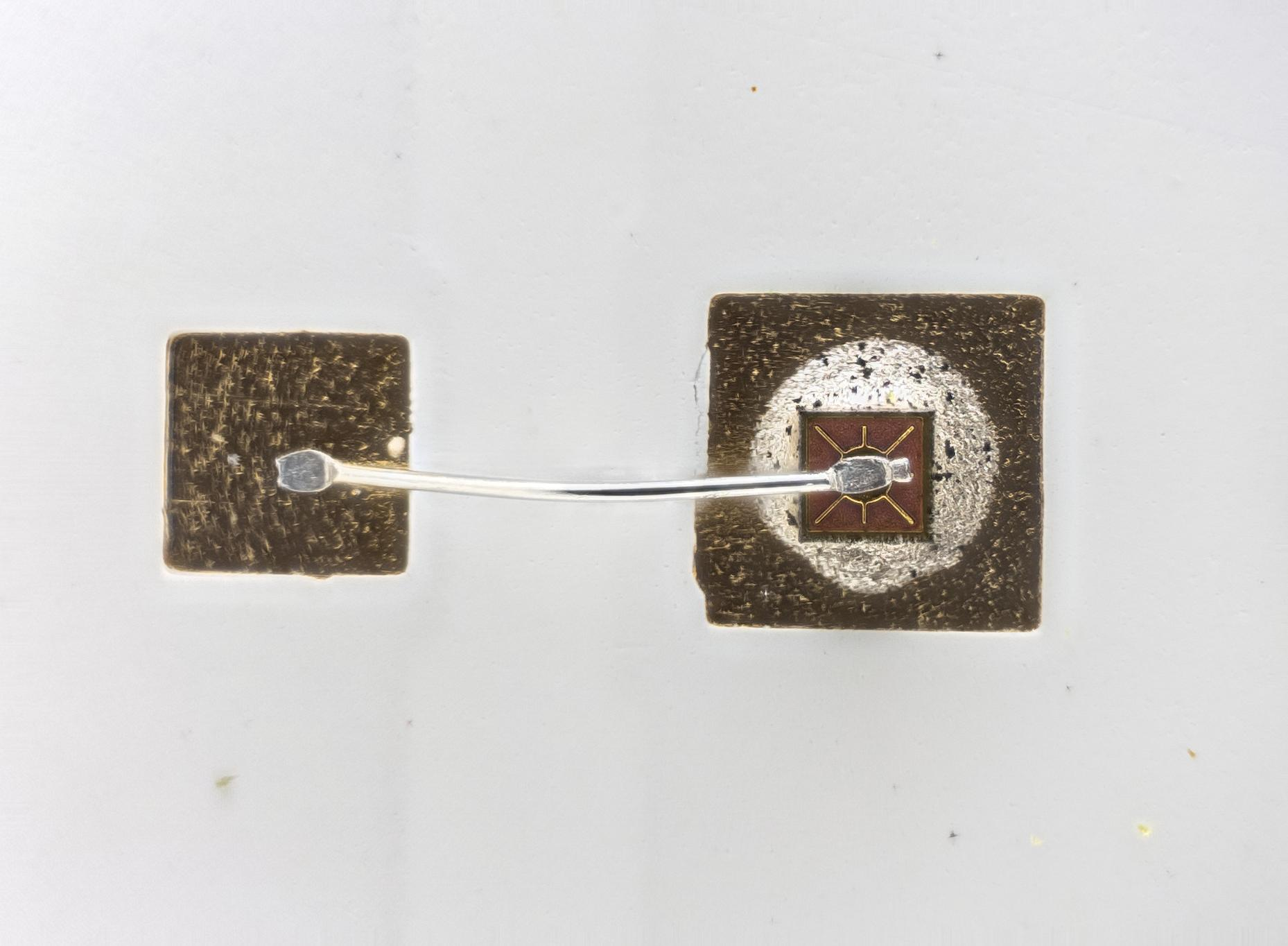
Close-up of Red LED

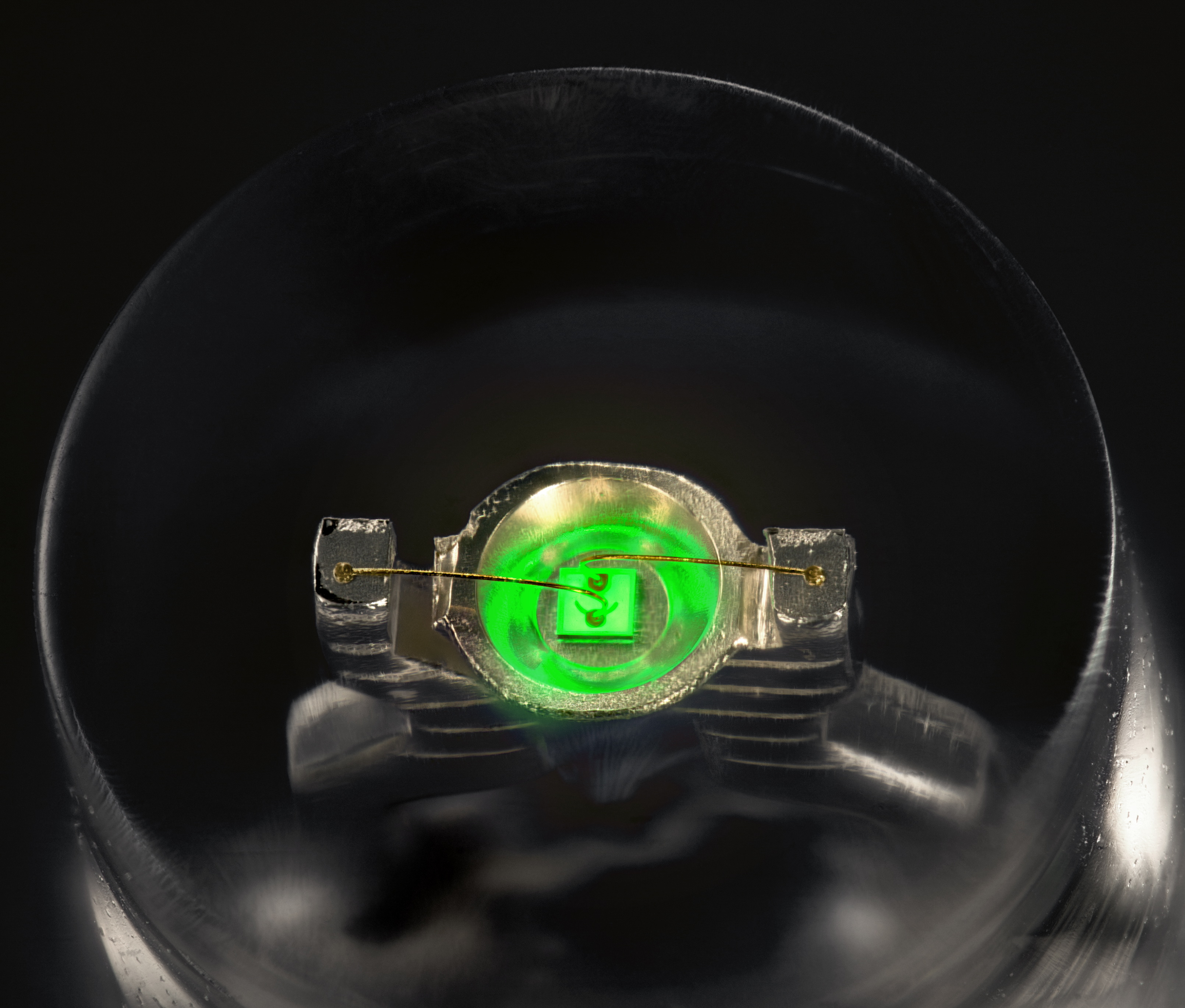
Close-up of InGaN-based green LED

== Initial commercial development ==
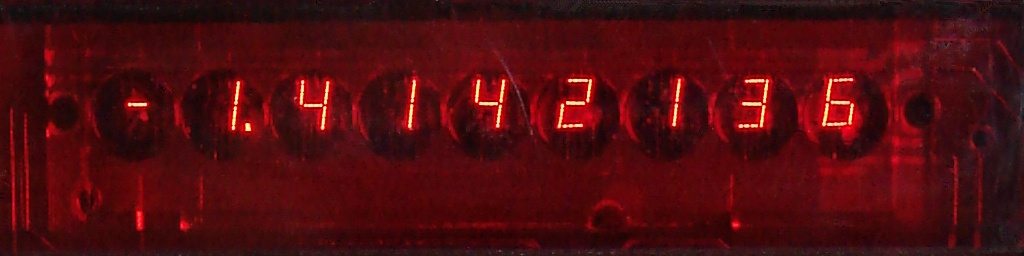
LED display of a TI-30 scientific calculator (c. 1978), which uses plastic lenses to increase the visible digit size

X-Ray of a 1970s 8-digit LED calculator display

Until 1968, visible and infrared LEDs were extremely costly, on the order of US$200 per unit, and so had little practical use. The first commercial visible-wavelength LEDs used GaAsP semiconductors and were commonly used as replacements for incandescent and neon indicator lamps, and in seven-segment displays, first in expensive equipment such as laboratory and electronics test equipment, then later in such appliances as calculators, TVs, radios, telephones, as well as watches.

The Hewlett-Packard company (HP) was engaged in research and development (R&D) on practical LEDs between 1962 and 1968, by a research team under Howard C. Borden, Gerald P. Pighini at HP Associates and HP Labs. During this time HP collaborated with Monsanto Company on developing the first usable LED products. The first usable LED products were HP's LED display and Monsanto's LED indicator lamp, both launched in 1968.

Monsanto was the first organization to mass-produce visible LEDs, using Gallium arsenide phosphide (GaAsP) in 1968 to produce red LEDs suitable for indicators. Monsanto had previously offered to supply HP with GaAsP, but HP decided to grow its own GaAsP. In February 1969, Hewlett-Packard introduced the HP Model 5082-7000 Numeric Indicator, the first LED device to use integrated circuit (integrated LED circuit) technology. It was the first intelligent LED display, and was a revolution in digital display technology, replacing the Nixie tube and becoming the basis for later LED displays.

In the 1970s, commercially successful LED devices at less than five cents each were produced by Fairchild Optoelectronics. These devices employed compound semiconductor chips fabricated with the planar process (developed by Jean Hoerni, ). The combination of planar processing for chip fabrication and innovative packaging methods enabled the team at Fairchild led by optoelectronics pioneer Thomas Brandt to achieve the needed cost reductions. LED producers have continued to use these methods as of about 2009.

The early red LEDs were bright enough for use as indicators, but the light output was not enough to illuminate an area. Readouts in calculators were so small that plastic lenses were built over each digit to make them legible. Later, other colors became widely available and appeared in appliances and equipment.

Early LEDs were packaged in metal cases similar to those of transistors, with a glass window or lens to let the light out. Modern indicator LEDs are packed in transparent molded plastic cases, tubular or rectangular in shape, and often tinted to match the device color. Infrared devices may be dyed, to block visible light. More complex packages have been adapted for efficient heat dissipation in high-power LEDs. Surface-mounted LEDs further reduce the package size. LEDs intended for use with fiber optics cables may be provided with an optical connector.

== Blue LED ==
The first blue-violet LED, using magnesium-doped gallium nitride was made at Stanford University in 1972 by Herb Maruska and Wally Rhines, doctoral students in materials science and engineering. At the time Maruska was on leave from RCA Laboratories, where he collaborated with Jacques Pankove on related work. In 1971, the year after Maruska left for Stanford, his RCA colleagues Pankove and Ed Miller demonstrated the first blue electroluminescence from zinc-doped gallium nitride, though the subsequent device Pankove and Miller built, the first actual gallium nitride light-emitting diode, emitted green light.

In 1974 the U.S. Patent Office awarded Maruska, Rhines, and Stanford professor David Stevenson a patent for their work in 1972 (U.S. Patent US3819974 A). Today, magnesium-doping of gallium nitride remains the basis for all commercial blue LEDs and laser diodes. In the early 1970s, these devices were too dim for practical use, and research into gallium nitride devices slowed.

In August 1989, Cree introduced the first commercially available blue LED, based on the indirect bandgap semiconductor, silicon carbide (SiC). SiC LEDs had very low efficiency, no more than about 0.03%, but did emit in the blue portion of the visible light spectrum.

In the late 1980s, key breakthroughs in GaN epitaxial growth and p-type doping ushered in the modern era of GaN-based optoelectronic devices. Building upon this foundation, Theodore Moustakas at Boston University patented a method for producing high-brightness blue LEDs using a new two-step process in 1991. In 2015, a US court ruled that three Taiwanese companies had infringed Moustakas's prior patent, and ordered them to pay licensing fees of not less than US$13 million.

Two years later, in 1993, high-brightness blue LEDs were demonstrated by Shuji Nakamura of Nichia Corporation using a gallium nitride (GaN) growth process. These LEDs had efficiencies of 10%. In parallel, Isamu Akasaki and Hiroshi Amano of Nagoya University were working on developing the important GaN deposition on sapphire substrates and the demonstration of p-type doping of GaN. This new development revolutionized LED lighting, making high-power blue light sources practical, leading to the development of technologies like Blu-ray.

Nakamura was awarded the 2006 Millennium Technology Prize for his invention. Nakamura, Hiroshi Amano, and Isamu Akasaki were awarded the Nobel Prize in Physics in 2014 for "the invention of efficient blue light-emitting diodes, which has enabled bright and energy-saving white light sources."

In 1995, Alberto Barbieri at the Cardiff University Laboratory (GB) investigated the efficiency and reliability of high-brightness LEDs and demonstrated a "transparent contact" LED using indium tin oxide (ITO) on (AlGaInP/GaAs).

In 2001 and 2002, processes for growing gallium nitride (GaN) LEDs on silicon were successfully demonstrated. In January 2012, Osram demonstrated high-power InGaN LEDs grown on silicon substrates commercially, and GaN-on-silicon LEDs are in production at Plessey Semiconductors. As of 2017, some manufacturers are using SiC as the substrate for LED production, as it has better latice match and thermal expansion to that of gallium nitride, but sapphire substrates are more common as they are cheaper and transparent. Samsung, the University of Cambridge, and Toshiba are performing research into GaN on Si LEDs.

Toshiba has stopped research, possibly due to low yields. Some opt for epitaxy, which is difficult on silicon, while others, like the University of Cambridge, choose a multi-layer structure, in order to reduce (crystal) lattice mismatch and different thermal expansion ratios, to avoid cracking of the LED chip at high temperatures (e.g. during manufacturing), reduce heat generation and increase luminous efficiency. Sapphire substrate patterning can be carried out with nanoimprint lithography.

GaN-on-Si is difficult but desirable since it takes advantage of existing semiconductor manufacturing infrastructure. It allows for the wafer-level packaging of LED dies resulting in extremely small LED packages.

GaN is often deposited using metalorganic vapour-phase epitaxy (MOCVD), and it also uses lift-off.

== White LEDs and the illumination breakthrough ==
Even though white light can be created using individual red, green and blue LEDs, this results in poor color rendering, since only three narrow bands of wavelengths of light are being emitted. The attainment of high efficiency blue LEDs was quickly followed by the development of the first white LED. In this device a Y_{3}Al_{5}O_{12}:Ce (known as "YAG" or Ce:YAG phosphor) cerium-doped phosphor coating produces yellow light through fluorescence. The combination of that yellow with remaining blue light appears white to the eye. Using different phosphors produces green and red light through fluorescence. The resulting mixture of red, green and blue is perceived as white light, with improved color rendering compared to wavelengths from the blue LED/YAG phosphor combination.

Illustration of Haitz's law, showing improvement in light output per LED over time, with a logarithmic scale on the vertical axis

The first white LEDs were expensive and inefficient. The light output then increased exponentially. The latest research and development has been propagated by Japanese manufacturers such as Panasonic and Nichia, and by Korean and Chinese manufacturers such as Samsung, Solstice, Kingsun, Hoyol and others. This trend in increased output has been called Haitz's law after Roland Haitz.

Light output and efficiency of blue and near-ultraviolet LEDs rose and the cost of reliable devices fell. This led to relatively high-power white-light LEDs for illumination, which are replacing incandescent and fluorescent lighting.

Experimental white LEDs were demonstrated in 2014 to produce 303 lumens per watt of electricity (lm/W); some can last up to 100,000 hours. Commercially available LEDs have an efficiency of up to 223 lm/W as of 2018. A previous record of 135 lm/W was achieved by Nichia in 2010. Compared to incandescent bulbs, this is a huge increase in electrical efficiency (not realized in cold climates when making use of electrical heating other than by heat-pumps, that then kicks in to offset the heat no longer produced by the incandescent bulbs). Even though LEDs are more expensive to purchase, overall lifetime cost is significantly cheaper than that of incandescent bulbs especially given their longer lifetime.

The LED chip is encapsulated inside a small, plastic, white mold although sometimes an LED package can incorporate a reflector. It can be encapsulated using resin (polyurethane-based), silicone, or epoxy containing (powdered) Cerium-doped YAG phosphor particles. The viscosity of phosphor-silicon mixtures must be carefully controlled. After application of a phosphor-silicon mixture on the LED using techniques such as jet dispensing, and allowing the solvents to evaporate, the LEDs are often tested, and placed on tapes for SMT placement equipment for use in LED light bulb production. Some "remote phosphor" LED light bulbs use a single plastic cover with YAG phosphor for one or several blue LEDs, instead of using phosphor coatings on single-chip white LEDs. Ce:YAG phosphors and epoxy in LEDs can degrade with use, and is more apparent with higher concentrations of Ce:YAG in phosphor-silicone mixtures, because the Ce:YAG decomposes with use.

The output of LEDs can shift to yellow over time due to degradation of the silicone. There are several variants of Ce:YAG, and manufacturers in many cases do not reveal the exact composition of their Ce:YAG offerings. Several other phosphors are available for phosphor-converted LEDs to produce several colors such as red, which uses nitrosilicate phosphors, and many other kinds of phosphor materials exist for LEDs such as phosphors based on oxides, oxynitrides, oxyhalides, halides, nitrides, sulfides, quantum dots, and inorganic-organic hybrid semiconductors. A single LED can have several phosphors at the same time. Some LEDs use phosphors made of glass-ceramic or composite phosphor/glass materials. Alternatively, the LED chips themselves can be coated with a thin coating of phosphor-containing material, called a conformal coating.

The temperature of the phosphor during operation and how it is applied limits the size of an LED die. Wafer-level packaged white LEDs allow for extremely small LEDs.

== Polychromatic ==
In 2024, QPixel introduced as polychromatic LED that could replace the 3-subpixel model for digital displays. The technology uses a gallium nitride semiconductor that emits light of different frequencies modulated by voltage changes. A prototype display achieved a resolution of 6,800 PPI or 3k x 1.5k pixels.
