= Oleg Losev =

Russian scientist and inventor (1903–1942)

- Олег Лосев
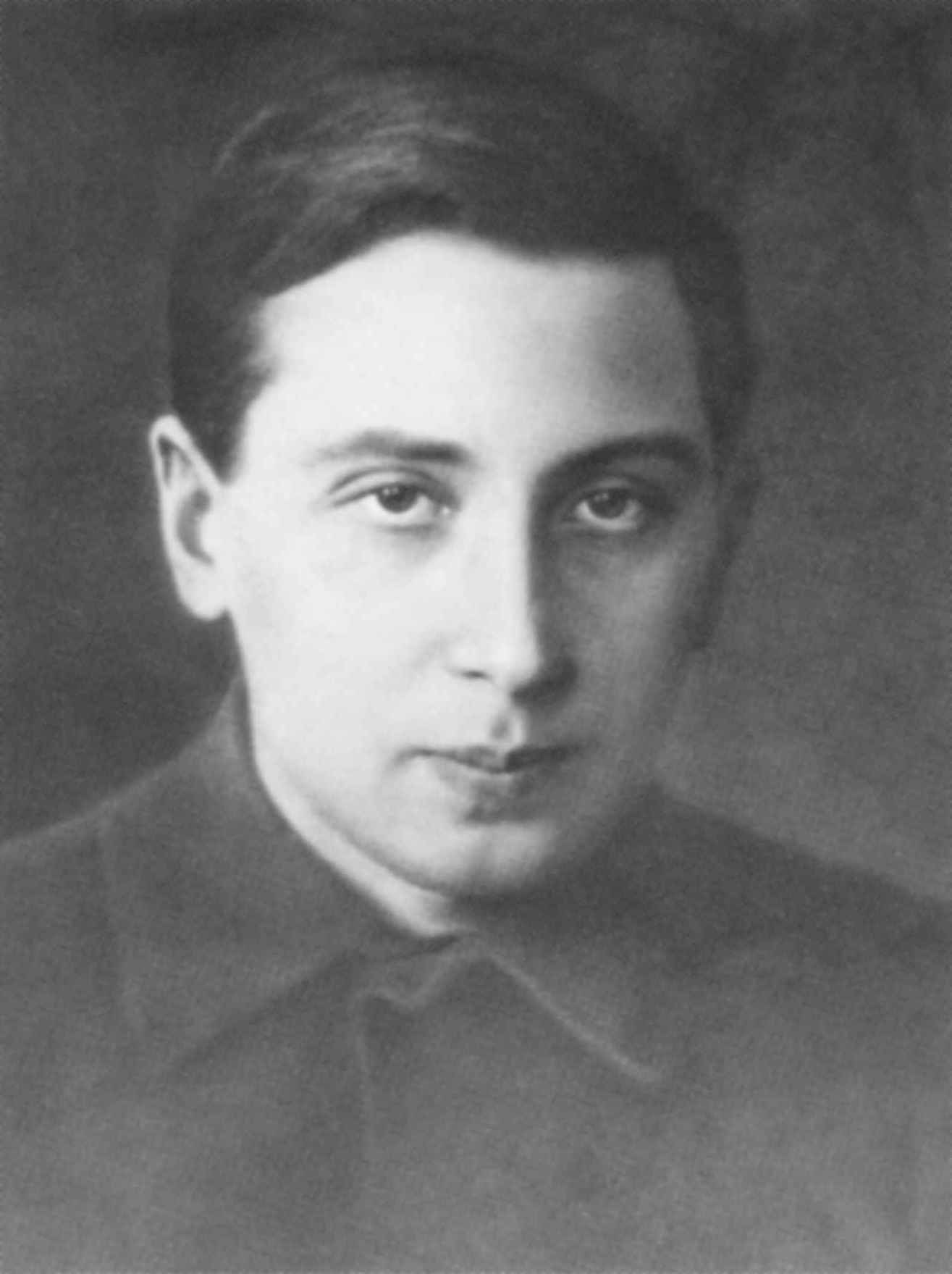
- Born: 10 May 1903; Tver, Tver Governorate, Russian Empire
- Died: 22 January 1942 (aged 38); Leningrad, Russian SFSR, Soviet Union
- Occupations: physicist, inventor
- Known for: Inventions, radio, LEDs
- Scientific career
- Fields: Physics, electrical engineering
- Workplaces: Nizhniy-Novgorod Radio Laboratory (NRL), Central Radio Laboratory (TSRL, Leningrad), Leningrad Physicotechnical Institute, First Leningrad Medical Institute

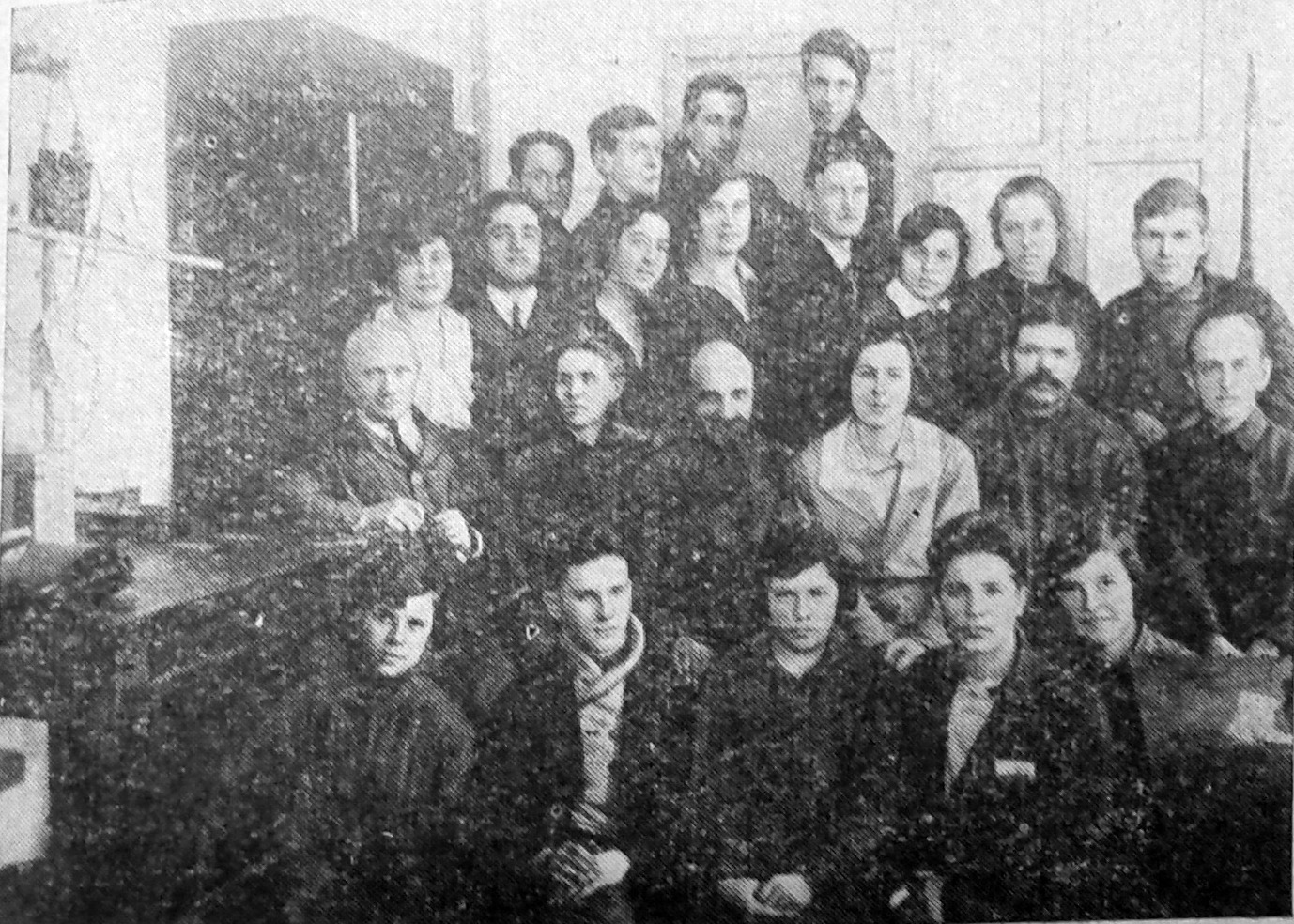
Employees of the Central Radio Laboratory, Leningrad, 1930. Losev is in fourth row, third from left.

Oleg Vladimirovich Losev (sometimes spelled Lossev or Lossew in English; Russian: Оле́г Влади́мирович Ло́сев; 10 May 1903 – 22 January 1942) was a Russian and Soviet scientist and inventor who made significant discoveries in the field of semiconductor junctions and the 6 "author's certificates" (the Soviet version of patents) for his discoveries. He observed light emission from carborundum point-contact junctions, constructing a light-emitting diode (LED), did the first research on them, proposed the first correct theory of how they worked, and used them in practical applications such as electroluminescence. He explored negative resistance in semiconductor junctions, and was first to use them practically for amplification, building the first solid-state amplifiers, electronic oscillators, and superheterodyne radio receivers, 25 years before the invention of the transistor. However his achievements were overlooked, and languished unknown for half a century before being recognized in the late 20th and early 21st century.

== Career and personal life ==
Losev was born into a noble family in Tver, Russia. His father was a retired captain in the Tsarist Imperial Army, who worked in the office of Tverskoy Vagonostroitelniy Zavod (Tversky Wagon Works), a local rolling stock factory. Losev graduated from secondary school in 1920.

At this time in Russian history, three years after the Bolshevik Revolution, during the upheaval of the Russian Civil War, an upper-class family background was a bar to higher education and career advancement. Losev went to work as a technician at the recently established Nizhny Novgorod Radio Laboratory (NNRL), the new Soviet government's first radio science laboratory, located in Nizhny Novgorod, where he worked under Vladimir Lebedinsky. Although he managed to attend a few classes, he remained throughout his life a self-taught scientist who never got to complete a college education, never had the support of a collaborator or research team, and never held a position higher than a technician. Nevertheless, he managed to conduct original research. His interests focused on the point-contact crystal detector (cat's whisker detector), which was used as a demodulator in the first early radio receivers, crystal radios before powered vacuum tube radios were developed in World War 1. These crude semiconductor diodes were the first semiconductor electronic devices, and although they were widely used, almost nothing was known about how they worked. Losev became one of the world's first semiconductor physicists.

When Nizhny Novgorod was shut down in 1928, he transferred along with many of the research staff to the Central Radio Laboratory (CRL) in Leningrad (St. Petersburg). At the invitation of director Abram Ioffe, from 1929 to 1933 he conducted research at the Ioffe Physical-Technical Institute. He was eventually awarded a PhD from the Institute in 1938 without completing a formal thesis, but it came too late to benefit his career. After much hardship, in 1937 Losev was forced to take a position as a technician at the physics department of the Leningrad First Medical Institute (now the First Pavlov State Medical University of St. Peterburg) which did not support his research interests, where he continued until 1942.

Losev died of starvation in 1942, at the age of 38, along with many other civilians, during the Siege of Leningrad by the Germans during World War 2. It is not known where he was buried.

== Light-emitting diodes ==
In radio receivers, crystal detectors were often forward-biased with DC current from a battery to make them more sensitive rectifiers. In the course of investigating biased junctions as a technician at Nizhny Novgorod around 1924, Losev noticed that when direct current was passed through a silicon carbide (carborundum) point contact junction, a spot of greenish light was given off at the contact point. Losev had constructed a light-emitting diode (LED). Although this effect had been noticed in 1907 by British Marconi engineer Henry Joseph Round, he had just published a brief two paragraph note on it. Losev was the first to investigate the effect, propose a theory of how it worked, and envision practical applications. In 1927, Losev published details in a Russian journal.

The series of articles on the LED Losev published between 1924 and 1941 constitute a thorough study of the device. He did extensive research into the mechanism of light emission. At the time, the prevailing theory of point contact junctions was that they worked by a thermoelectric effect, possibly due to microscopic electric arcs. Losev measured rates of evaporation of benzine from the crystal surface and found it was not accelerated when light was emitted, concluding that the luminescence was a "cold" light not caused by thermal effects. He theorized correctly that the explanation of the light emission was in the new science of quantum mechanics, speculating that it was the inverse of the photoelectric effect explained by Albert Einstein in 1905. He wrote to Einstein about it, but did not receive a reply.

He developed a practical solid-state silicon carbide light source, which generated light by electroluminescence. Silicon carbide is an indirect bandgap semiconductor and so was very inefficient as a light-emitting diode, much less efficient than the direct bandgap semiconductor materials used in modern LEDs, such as gallium nitride. No one saw a use for these weak green lights except Losev.

In 1951, Kurt Lehovec et al. published a paper in Physical Review. Losev's papers were cited but his name appeared as Lossew.

In the April 2007 issue of Nature Photonics, Nikolay Zheludev gives credit to Losev for inventing the LED. Specifically, Losev patented the "Light Relay" and foresaw its use in telecommunications.

== Solid-state electronics ==
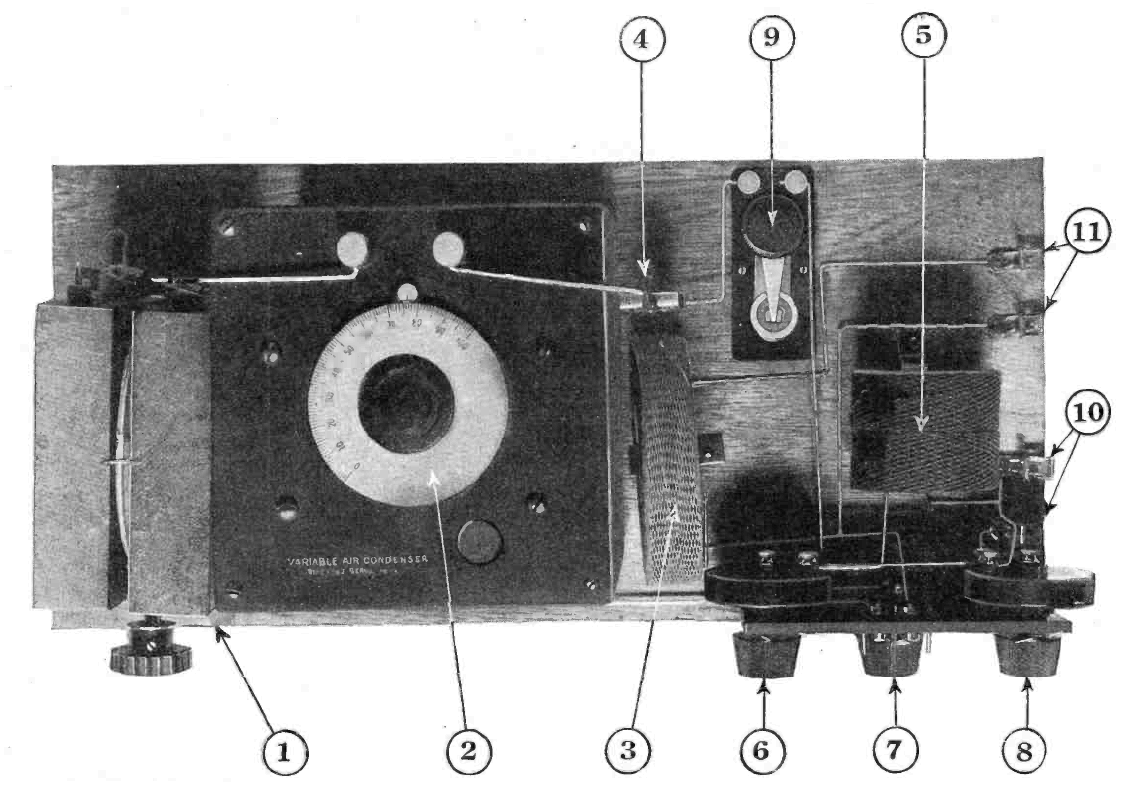
"Crystodyne" zinc oxide electronic oscillator constructed by Hugo Gernsback in 1924 to Losev's instructions. The zinc oxide point contact diode which serves as the active device is labeled (9). These devices were the first semiconductor oscillators.

When a DC bias voltage was applied to a cat's whisker detector, in order to increase its sensitivity as a detector in a crystal radio, it occasionally broke into spontaneous oscillation, producing a radio frequency alternating current. This was a negative resistance effect, and had been noticed around 1909 by researchers such as William Henry Eccles and G. W. Pickard. but not much attention had been paid to it. In 1923 Losev began to research these "oscillating crystals" and discovered that biased zincite (zinc oxide) crystals could amplify a signal. Losev was the first to exploit negative resistance diodes practically; he realized that they could serve as simpler, cheaper replacements for vacuum tubes. He used these junctions to build solid-state versions of amplifiers, oscillators, and TRF and regenerative radio receivers, at frequencies up to 5 MHz, 25 years before the transistor. He even built a superheterodyne receiver. However his achievements were overlooked because of the success of vacuum tube technology. The Soviet authorities did not support him, and zincite crystals were hard to come by because they had to be imported from the United States. After ten years he abandoned research into this technology (dubbed "Crystodyne" by Hugo Gernsback), and it was forgotten.

Negative resistance in diodes was rediscovered in 1956 in the tunnel diode, and today negative resistance diodes like the Gunn diode and IMPATT diode are used in microwave oscillators and amplifiers and are some of the most widely used sources of microwaves.
