= Georges Destriau =

French physicist (1903–1960)

- Born: 1 August 1903; Bordeaux, France
- Died: 20 January 1960; Paris, France
- Citizenship: France
- Education: École Centrale des Arts et Manufactures
- Known for: Electroluminescence
- Scientific career
- Fields: Physics, chemistry
- Workplaces: University of Paris; Institut du Radium; University of Bordeaux; Sorbonne

Georges Destriau (1 August 1903 – 20 January 1960) was a French physicist and early observer of electroluminescence.

== Education and research ==
In 1926 Destriau became an engineer at the École Centrale des Arts et Manufactures in Paris. Thereafter he worked in the x-ray device industry. From 1932 until 1941 Destriau worked at the Centre National de la Recherche Scientifique. A brief stay at the University of Bordeaux was followed in 1943 by a move to Paris. In 1946 Destriau became professor at the University of Poitiers and in 1954 at the Sorbonne in Paris. Later Destriau worked for Westinghouse Electric.

Destriau worked in the field of magnetism and X-ray dosimetry of ionizing radiation. Best-known is his research on electroluminescence, which he carried out in 1935 in the Paris laboratory of Marie Curie, who had died a year earlier. Destriau observed that zinc sulfide crystals fluoresced when doped with traces of copper ions and suspended in castor oil between two mica platelets, with a strong alternating electric field applied. Later he replaced the castor oil and mica with a polymer binder.

The effect of electroluminescence is therefore also referred to in some publications as the "Destriau effect". According to some publications, Destriau was the first to use the term "electrophotoluminescence". In his publications, he himself called the light "Losev-Light", after the Russian radio frequency technician Oleg Losev, who in 1927 worked with silicon carbide crystals to induce a light effect (also electroluminescence).
