= Theodore Moustakas =

Materials physicist

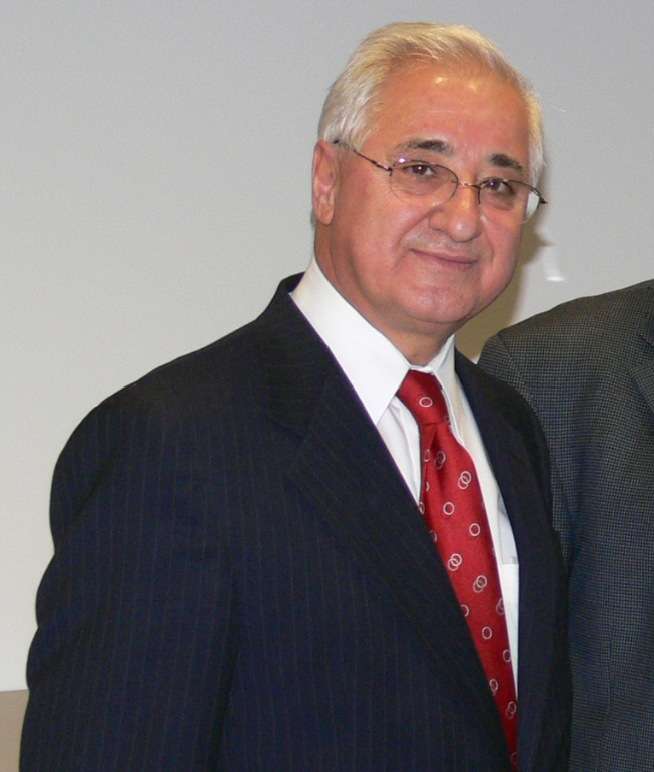
- Moustakas in 2007
- Born: 1940 (age 85–86); Greece
- Education: Aristotle University of Thessaloniki; (BSc, 1964), Columbia University; (PhD, 1974)
- Known for: Blue LED
- Scientific career
- Fields: Optoelectronics, photonics
- Workplaces: Boston University
- Thesis: Transport and recombination properties of amorphous arsenic telluride thin films (1974)
- Doctoral advisor: Kurt Weiser

Theodore D. Moustakas (born 1940) is a Greek researcher in photonics and optoelectronics. He holds the title of Distinguished Professor at the Boston University Department of Electrical & Computer Engineering. He is known for his patents in epitaxial lithography and synthesis process that led to the development of the blue light-emitting diode (LED).

== Early life and education ==
In 1964, he completed a Bachelor of Science (B.Sc.) in Physics from Aristotle University. Moustakas attained a doctoral degree and a M.Phil. in 1974 at Columbia University in Solid State Science and Engineering, with his thesis titled Transport and recombination properties of amorphous arsenic telluride thin films.

== Co-inventor of blue LED ==
=== Role ===
In August 1991, Moustakas published details on a buffer-layer process for growing high-purity GaN on a substrate using a two-step MOCVD process. Several months later, Shuji Nakamura, then a doctoral student at the Nichia Corporation, published similar results in a different journal and later used the process to create a blue LED. Moustakas had also filed a patent (the so-called buffer-layer patent) at the time of his discovery. As the process Moustakas developed is indispensable in creating blue LEDs, and since he was the first to come up with the process, he is considered to have co-invented the blue LED.

=== Nobel prize controversy ===
In 2014, the Nobel Prize in Physics was awarded to Isamu Akasaki, Hiroshi Amano, and Shuji Nakamura "for the invention of efficient blue light-emitting diodes which has enabled bright and energy-saving white light sources". However, as Moustakas' role in discovering the blue LED were significant, there has been controversy about that he did not receive recognition and was left "in the dark" by the Nobel Committee. Following the announcement, the then managing director of Boston University's Office of Technology Development tweeted

Nobel Committee gets it wrong on not including BU professor Ted Moustakas as co-inventor of the blue LED.

— Vinit Nijhawan (October 7, 2014)

Despite this, Moustakas and some of the co-inventors remain colleagues. At the 2016 BU ECE symposium, Nakamura gave a speech about blue LEDs, also honoring Moustakas.

=== Patent infringement lawsuits ===
==== 2015 ====
In 2015, Boston University won 13 million dollars in a patent infringement suit, where it was found that three companies had infringed on one of Moustakas' patents related to blue LEDs, used in various cell phones, tablets, laptops, and lighting products. The patent in question is titled Highly insulating monocrystalline gallium nitride thin films (US5686738A), and was filed in 1995 and granted in 1997. However, on July 25, 2018, the CAFC overturned the lower court and invalidated U.S. Patent No. 5686738 based on a lack of enablement.

==== 2002 ====
In 2002, Boston University was involved in a legal dispute with Nichia Corporation, centered around some of Moustakas' patents related to a GaN synthesis process for blue LEDs. Cree Lighting, Inc., a North Carolina company, had exclusively licensed some of these patents. Nichia had alleged that Cree was involved in trade secret theft, to which Cree and BU jointly sued Nichia for infringing on Moustakas' so-called buffer-layer patent. In the same year on November 13, the companies entered into a patent cross-license agreement, and a settlement.

== RayVio company ==
Moustakas and others created a company focusing on UV LED technology, called RayVio.

== Awards and honors ==
Moustakas has received several awards including:

- 1998 Award for Excellence in Teaching from Boston University Department of Electrical and Computer Engineering
- 2009 Dean's Catalyst Award from Boston University College of Engineering
- 2010 Innovator Award from North American Conference on Molecular Beam Epitaxy
- 2011 Distinguished Scholar from Boston University College of Engineering
- 2013 Innovator of the Year Award from Boston University

He is also elected fellow of the American Physical Society (1994), the Electrochemical Society (1997), the National Academy of Inventors (2012), the IEEE (2014), Optica (2021) and the Materials Research Society (2022).

Moustakas also hold an honorary doctoral degree for Excellence in Research from Aristotle University (2003).
