= Greenleaf Whittier Pickard =

American electrical engineer and inventor (1877–1956

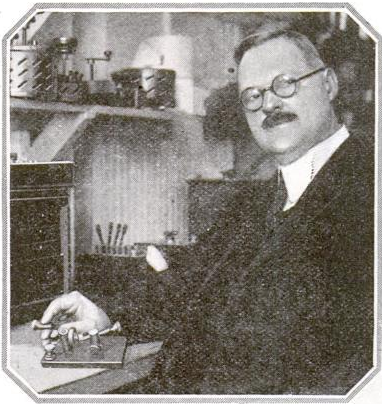
- Pickard in his Boston laboratory
- Born: February 14, 1877; Portland, Maine, U.S.
- Died: January 8, 1956 (aged 78); Newton, Massachusetts, U.S.
- Education: Harvard University Massachusetts Institute of Technology
- Occupations: Engineer; inventor
- Known for: Crystal detector
- Awards: IRE Medal of Honor (1926)

Greenleaf Whittier Pickard (February 14, 1877 – January 8, 1956) was an American electrical engineer and inventor. He was largely responsible and most famous for the development of the crystal detector, the earliest type of diode detector, although he was not the earliest discoverer of the rectifying properties of contact between certain solid materials. The crystal detector was the central component in many early radio receivers from around 1906 until about 1920. Pickard also experimented with antennas, radio wave propagation and noise suppression.

Greenleaf Whittier Pickard was a graduate of both Harvard University and Massachusetts Institute of Technology.

On August 30, 1906, he filed a patent for a silicon crystal detector, which was granted on November 20, 1906.

On June 10, 1907, he filed a patent for a "Magnetic Aerial" (a loop aerial) which was granted on January 21, 1908. Pickard's loop antenna had directional properties that could be used to reduce interference to the intended wireless communications.

On June 21, 1911, he filed a patent on a crystal detector incorporating a springy low inertia wire of about 24-gauge formed with a loop or helix and pointed to make contact with the crystal. Crystal detectors incorporating this construction would become the most widely used and popularly known by the term cat whisker detector. This patent was granted on July 21, 1914.

Greenleaf Whittier Pickard was named after his great-uncle, the American Quaker John Greenleaf Whittier (1807–1892). He was the grandson of author and humorist Mathew Franklin Whittier. Pickard was president of the Institute of Radio Engineers in 1913.

== Patents ==
- U.S. patent 796,011 - Electrostatic separation
- U.S. patent 796,012 - Electrostatic separation
- U.S. patent 827,115 - Electrostatic separation
- U.S. patent 827,116 - Electrostatic separation
- U.S. patent 836,531 - Means for receiving intelligence communicated by electric waves (silicon detector), 1906
- U.S. patent 840,802 - Electrostatic separator, 1907
- U.S. patent 845,316 - Means for receiving intelligence communicated by electric waves (copper sulfate solution detector), 1907
- U.S. patent 876,996 - Intelligence intercommunication by magnetic wave component (loop antenna), 1908
- U.S. patent 877,451 - Means for receiving intelligence communicated by electric waves (spring-loaded detector contact), 1908
- U.S. patent 886,154 - Oscillation receiver (fused zinc oxide detector), 1908
- U.S. patent 888,191 - Oscillation receiver (polished silicon detector, 1908
- U.S. patent 904,222 - Oscillation detecting means (molybdenite detector), 1908
- U.S. patent 912,613 - Oscillation detector and rectifier ("plated" silicon carbide detector with DC bias), G.W. Pickard, 1909
- U.S. patent 912,726 - Oscillation receiver (fractured surface red zinc oxide (zincite) detector), 1909
- U.S. patent 933,263 - Oscillation device (iron pyrite detector), 1909
- U.S. patent 956,165 - Electrical Space Communication (interference mitigation), 1909
- U.S. patent 972,715 - Telephone receiving apparatus (protective piece and adjustable diaphragm distance), 1910
- U.S. patent 1,104,073 - Detector for wireless telegraphy and telephony (looped or humped springy wire detector contact), 1914
- U.S. patent 1,118,228 - Oscillation detectors (pairs of minerals), 1914
- U.S. patent 1,128,817 - Valve detector for wireless (vacuum tube with conducting shield to drain static), 1915
- U.S. patent 1,185,711 - Receiver for wireless telephony and telegraphy (interrupted or switched circuit instead of rectifier), 1916
- U.S. patent 1,213,250 - Means for receiving intelligence communicated by electric waves (receiving circuit, divided from #836531), 1917
- U.S. patent 1,476,102 - Optical selection of split mica sheets
- U.S. patent 1,561,483 - Distinguishing dielectric sheets
- U.S. patent 1,676,745 - Electrical reactance and method and apparatus
- U.S. patent 1,907,571 - Radio Receiving Apparatus (multiple loop antennas), 1920
- U.S. patent 1,918,825 - Extreme loading condenser

Reissued

- U.S. patent RE13798 - Means for receiving intelligence communicated by electric waves
