= Nizhny Novgorod Radio Laboratory =

Soviet-Russian laboratory

Coordinates: 56.3294°N 44.0136°E

Nizhny Novgorod Radio Laboratory (Russian: Нижегородская радиолаборатория, НРЛ) was the first Soviet science laboratory in the field of radio electronics. It was based in 1918 in Nizhny Novgorod. In 1928, the laboratory was reorganized and moved into the Central Radio Laboratory in Leningrad.

== History ==
In 1918 a group of radio laboratory staff was transferred from Tver to Nizhny Novgorod. The manager was Vladimir Mikhailovich Leshchinsky, the scientist was Mikhail Aleksandrovich Bonch-Bruevich.

In 1919 the laboratory began to produce receiving and amplifying radio tubes. In 1922 NRL employees built a radio broadcasting station in Moscow, named after the Comintern, which at that time turned out to be the most powerful in the world. In 1923 generator tubes with a water-cooled anode with a capacity of 25 kW were created, they were the first in the world. In 1926 a 40-kilowatt transmitter of the Moscow radio station on Shabolovka was built.

In 1928 the laboratory became part of the Leningrad Central Radio Laboratory.
