= H. J. Round =

English engineer (1881–1966)

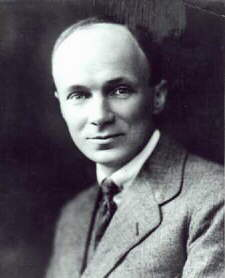
- Henry Joseph Round, c. 1920
- Born: Henry Joseph Round; 2 June 1881; Kingswinford, Staffordshire, England
- Died: 17 August 1966 (aged 85); Bognor Regis, England
- Known for: radio, light-emitting diode
- Title: Captain

Captain Henry Joseph Round MC (2 June 1881 – 17 August 1966) was an English engineer and one of the early pioneers of radio. He was the first to report the observation of electroluminescence from a solid state diode, leading to the discovery of the light-emitting diode. He was a personal assistant to Guglielmo Marconi.

Round was the eldest child of Joseph and Gertrude Round. He spent his early years in the small town of Kingswinford in Staffordshire and received his early education at Cheltenham Grammar School. He later attended the Royal College of Science, a constituent college of Imperial College London, where he gained a first-class honours degree.

Round joined the Marconi Company in 1902, not long after Marconi had made his transatlantic wireless transmission. He was sent to the United States, where he experimented with a variety of different aspects of radio technology, focusing on technologies such as powdered iron cored tuning inductors. He also performed some experiments with transmission paths over land and sea at different times of the day and investigated direction finding, for which he used a frame antenna.

== Vacuum tube development ==
Round made important contributions to the development of the first vacuum tubes. He headed Marconi's research program into thermionic tubes and developed a three-element (triode) amplifying tube at roughly the same time as Lee De Forest was developing the Audion in the US. He discovered feedback (regeneration) in vacuum tubes independently along with Alexander Meissner and Edwin Armstrong, and built some of the first AM vacuum tube radio transmitters. He patented the first design for an indirectly heated cathode, the type of cathode widely used in vacuum tubes today.

== Light-emitting diode ==
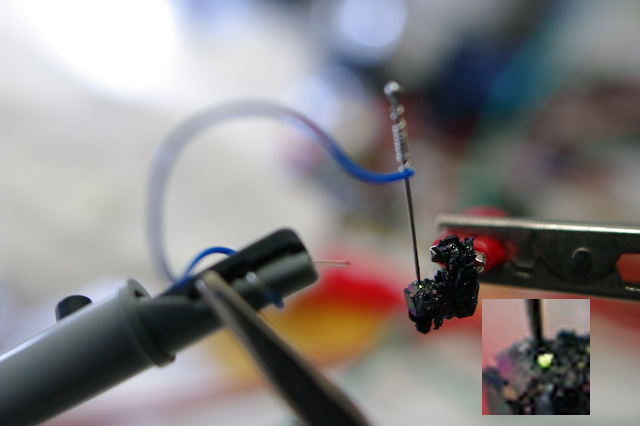
Recreation of the 1907 experiment by H. J. Round on the observation of electroluminescence from a point contact with a carborundum (silicon carbide) crystal

In some later experiments with cat's whisker detectors using a variety of substances, he passed current through them and noticed that some gave off light – the first known report of the effect of the light-emitting diode (LED). Round published his result in 1907 in Electrical World:

To the Editors of Electrical World:

SIRS: – During an investigation of the unsymmetrical passage of current through a contact of carborundum and other substances, a curious phenomenon was noted. On applying a potential of 10 volts between two points on a crystal of carborundum, the crystal gave out a yellowish light. Only one or two specimens could be found, which gave a bright glow on such a low voltage, but with 110 volts, a large number could be found to glow. In some crystals, only edges gave the light, and others gave instead of a yellow light green, orange, or blue. In all cases tested, the glow appears to come from the negative pole, a bright blue-green spark appearing at the positive pole. In a single crystal, if contact is made near the center with the negative pole, and the positive pole is put in contact at any other place, only one section of the crystal will glow, and that same section, wherever the positive pole is placed.

There seems to be some connection between the above effect and the e.m.f. produced by a junction of carborundum and another conductor when heated by a direct or alternating current, but the connection may be only secondary as an obvious explanation of the e.m.f. effect is the thermoelectric one. The writer would be glad of references to any published account of an investigation of this or any allied phenomena.

New York, N. Y.

H. J. Round

== Military service ==
The First World War broke out in 1914, and in December 1914, Round was commissioned onto the General List and was seconded to the newly established Intelligence Corps with the rank of temporary lieutenant. Using his experience in direction finding, Round set up a series of direction-finding stations along the Western Front.

These wireless direction-finding stations proved so successful that a chain of wireless direction-finding stations (named 'B' stations to differentiate them from interception stations which were designated 'Y' stations) were installed along the British coastline to monitor the movements of German airships, ships, and U-boats (submarines). In May 1916, the stations were monitoring transmissions from the German Navy at anchor at Wilhelmshaven. On 30 May the stations reported a 1.5-degree change in the direction of the signals - suggesting that the ships were on the move. Consequently, the British Admiralty ordered the British fleet to set sail and engage the German fleet. The Battle of Jutland, the largest sea battle of all time, occurred the next day.

On 6 September 1916, possibly in recognition of his contribution to the Battle of Jutland and in wider recognition of his work, Round was appointed as a temporary Captain "while [employed] of [special] duty." Round's promotion to temporary Captain at the Intelligence Corps was confirmed in the 1917 New Year Honours.

On 31 May 1918 and in recognition of his service during the war, Round was awarded the Military Cross.

After the war, Round returned to civilian life and became involved in radio transmitters and was heavily involved in the first broadcasts made in the United Kingdom. Round became Chief Engineer at Marconi's Wireless Telegraph Company in 1921, but some years later, he left to set up his own consultancy.

When the Second World War broke out in 1939, the British Government again called on his services. This time he was involved in ASDIC (Anti-Submarine Detection Investigation Committee) which is known today as sonar.

== Later life ==
In 1961 - possibly in honour of his 80th birthday - Jeanne D. Round made a bronze bust of "Captain H.J. Round, M.C.", now owned by BAE Systems and on loan to Sandford Mill, part of Chelmsford Museum. Round died in August 1966, aged 85, in a nursing home in Bognor Regis after a short illness.
