= Hiwatt =

British musical equipment manufacturer

Hiwatt Amplification
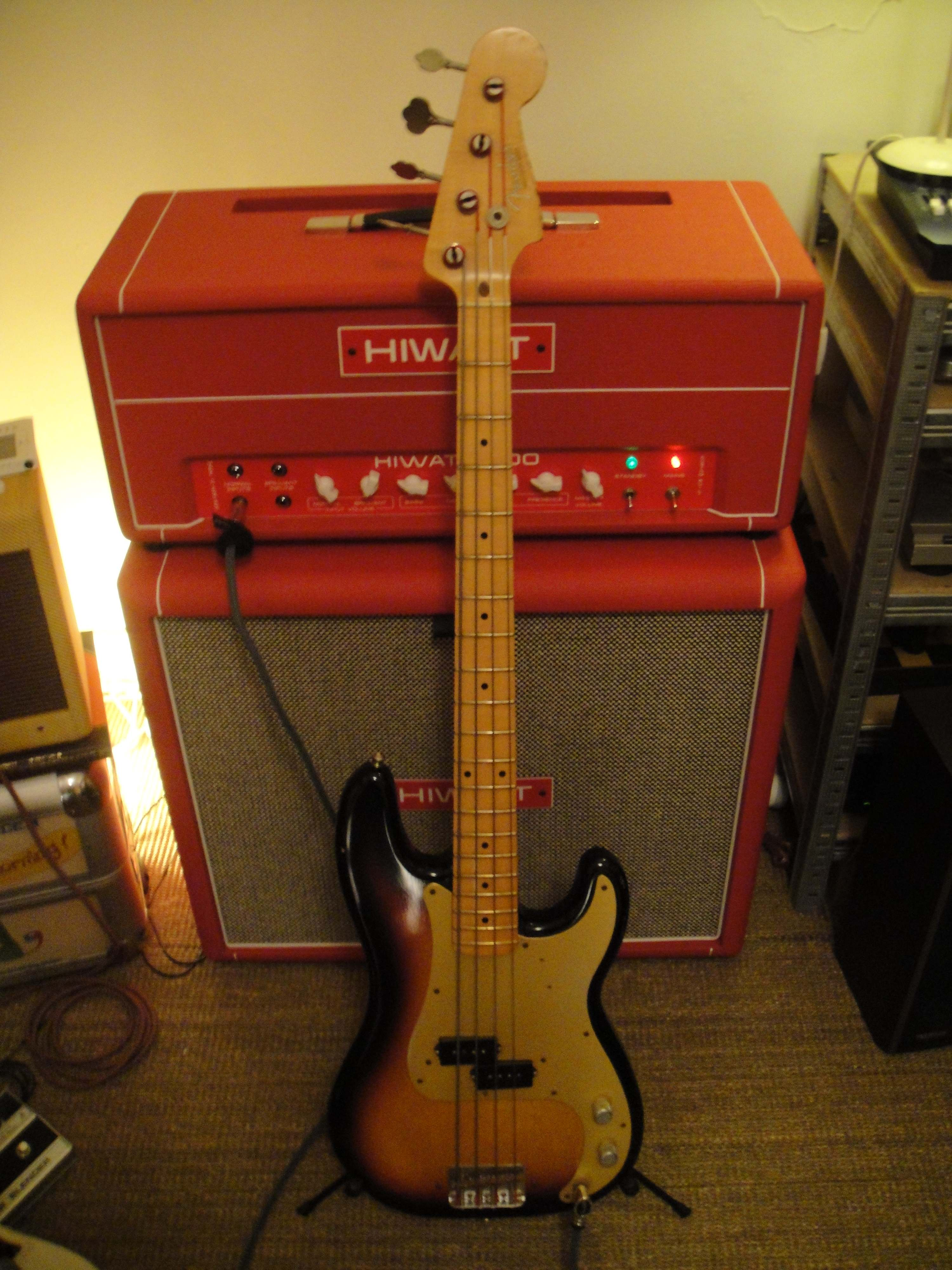
- A Hiwatt amplifier with a Fender Precision Bass
- Type: Amplification
- Industry: Amplification
- Founded: Surrey, England
- Founder: Dave Reeves
- Headquarters: England
- Website: hiwatt.co.uk

Hiwatt is a British manufacturer of guitar amplifiers founded by Dave Reeves in 1968. Reeves initially set up the company Hylight to manufacture amplifiers of his own design before agreeing to build amps instead for Ivor Arbiter's brand Sound City. Pete Townshend and John Entwistle of the Who and Jimi Hendrix were early fans of Reeves' Sound City-branded amps. Modifications to one such model—done at the request of Townshend—resulted in what would become the DR103 Custom 100, which Reeves released as his first amp model under the Hiwatt brand name after his contract with Arbiter expired.

Hiwatt's amps helped define the sound of rock music of the era alongside fellow British brands Marshall and Vox, but differed from this competition by emphasizing high headroom and power over distortion, while using military spec components and wiring. In the 1970s, players like David Gilmour of Pink Floyd and Keith Richards of the Rolling Stones notably began using Hiwatts. Reeves, however, died in 1981 and Hiwatt ceased production. Several manufacturers have since been founded to produce Hiwatt-style amplifiers, while the Hiwatt brand itself later reemerged under new ownership.

== History ==
=== Early years ===
==== Amplifier designs ====
Dave Reeves began repairing amplifiers while employed by Mullard. Having received electronics training while serving in the Royal Air Force, he noticed many of these amps were made poorly and unable to withstand much abuse. Made redundant at Mullard in 1966, Reeves turned to designing his own amplifiers from scratch. Reeves' core design was a major departure from other brands' work of the time, emphasizing efficiency, power, and headroom over saturation and overdrive. The volume of Reeves' amps far exceeded their wattage ratings and typically did not produce much distortion until achieving "ear-shattering levels." Components like Partridge transformers also leant the amps a "hi-fi" character and contributed to their full-sounding tone. With durability in mind, Reeves used military spec construction methods and wiring, resulting in more rugged amps that were less prone to radio-frequency interference and with a significantly lower noise floor. The "Hiwatt" name was first used on an amp by Reeves in 1964, but this was likely a one-off project.

==== Hylight and Sound City ====
Reeves founded the Hylight company to construct his amps, registering the name in September 1966. To help finance the start of his company, Reeves contracted with Ivor Arbiter's Sound City music store to manufacture Sound City-branded guitar amplifiers. Arbiter's various ventures had already produced noteworthy early effects pedals like the Dallas Rangemaster Treble Booster and Dallas-Arbiter Fuzz Face, but Sound City was facing better-developed competition in the amplifier market when Arbiter hired Reeves, who used his own amplifier design re-badged with the Sound City name. These amps were made in large numbers with a focus on affordability, and as a result they were seen as inferior to competing amps from Marshall and Vox. The reputation of Sound City amps also suffered from venues of the day forcing players to use them as "pedal platforms" with the volume kept low, whereas Reeves had intended his amps to be played loud through large speaker enclosures.

Following a financial disagreement between Marshall and the Who's management in 1967, John Entwistle and Pete Townshend became early adopters of Sound City amps. Townshend also recommended them to Jimi Hendrix when asked for his opinion on amplification, and the Jimi Hendrix Experience began using Sound City amplifiers in addition to their Marshalls. In late 1968, the Who approached Arbiter with a request for Sound City amplifiers with slight modifications. Arbiter declined the request, but Reeves agreed and created customised Sound City L100 amplifiers for the band. Shortly thereafter, Reeves' contract with Sound City expired, allowing him to focus on building his own Hiwatt-branded models without the limitations on craftmanship and component quality imposed on him by Arbiter's business model.

=== Hiwatt ===
==== Reeves era ====
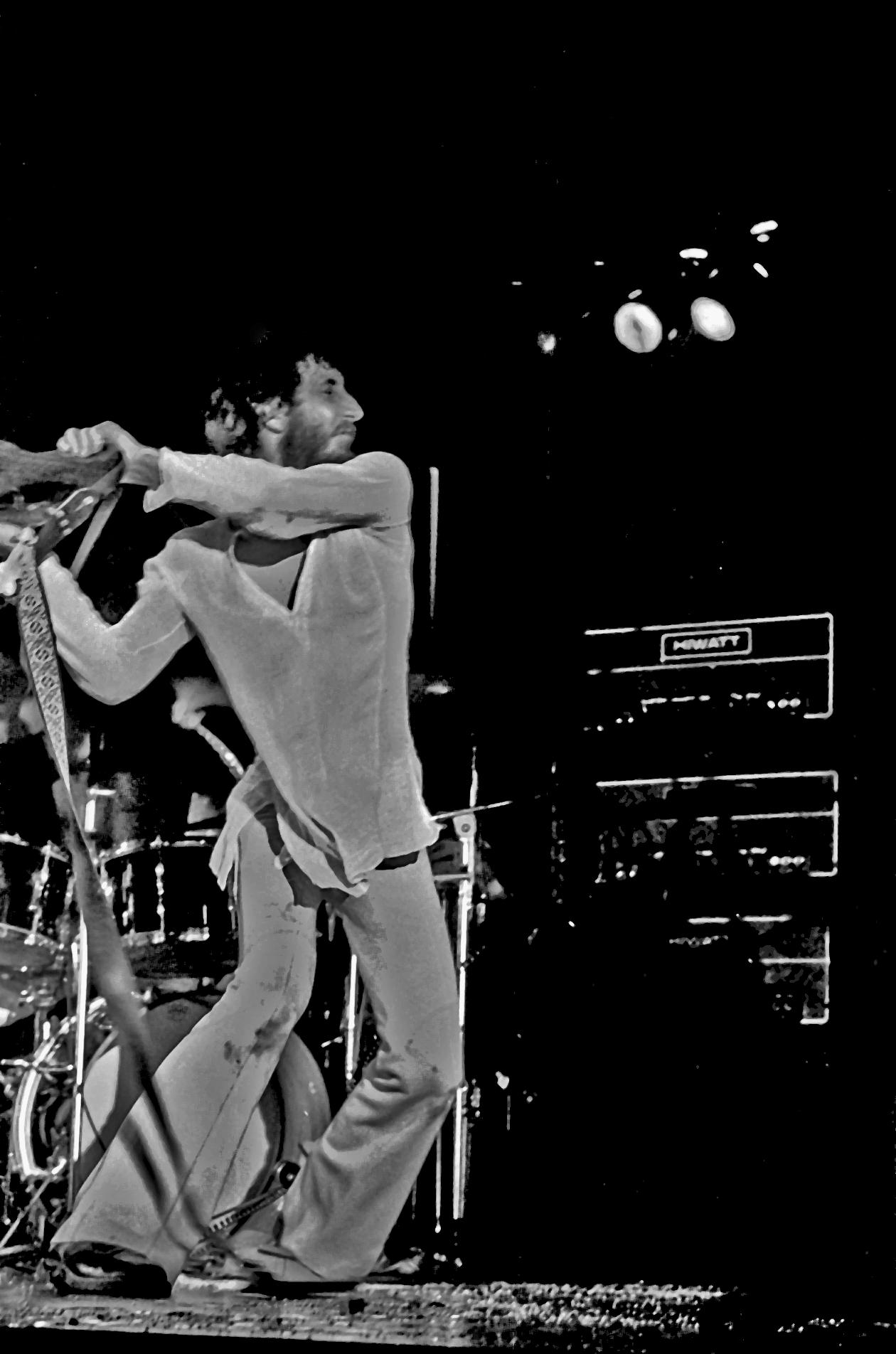
Pete Townshend smashing a Gibson SG. Behind him are a set of Hiwatt amps. Both were a staple ingredient of The Who's sound between 1969 and 1972.

Under the Hiwatt brand, Reeves' customized Sound City L100 amplifiers were renamed the DR103 Custom 100, which would go on to become the company's best-selling amplifier of the era. Reeves originally sold direct to musicians so he could reinvest the profits that would have gone to distributors and music stores back into growing the Hiwatt brand. Ivor Arbiter later sued Reeves, alleging Reeves had stolen Sound City's design; however, when Reeves challenged Arbiter's engineers to explain certain design elements of the amp circuit in court, they could not and the case was thrown out.

Reeves initially built Hiwatt's amps in his garage in New Malden, Surrey, with the help of Doug Fentiman and Reeves' wife, Daphne, but would later move production to a dedicated facility after numerous noise complaints from neighbors. They built amps and cabinets to military specs, and the brand gained a reputation for producing amps that were "built like tanks". In these early years, however, there was a great deal of variation in Hiwatt's amps, as Reeves often took customer requests. Some of his amps, for example, were given tone stacks similar to Marshall and Fender designs. Reeves also did contracted work making amps during this time, most notably for Sola Sound.

One of the earliest famous Hiwatt users was Jethro Tull bassist Glenn Cornick. It was at Cornick's urging that the first 200-watt (and later 400-watt) Hiwatt amps were produced, the DR201 (and DR405). Keith Richards, Mick Taylor, and Bill Wyman all used DR201s at the Rolling Stones' free 1969 outdoor festival at Hyde Park. Pete Townshend, who worked with Reeves on the Sound City amps and had become a Hiwatt endorser, prominently featured Hiwatts as his onstage backdrop during the Who's 1970 Live at Leeds concert.

With Hiwatt growing in popularity, Reeves hired former band road manager Peter Webber, who used his connections to get Hiwatt amps into the hands of many notable artists. In addition to Townshend, Hiwatt players of this era included David Gilmour, Jimmy Page, Manfred Mann, and the Moody Blues. By 1971, Hiwatt was struggling to keep up with production, so Reeves hired certified government wirer Harry Joyce to wire chassis for the company. Under Joyce, schematics were standardized, eliminating previous variations in design, and the brand solidified its reputation for producing "big, high-headroom machines." Joyce limited his workload to 40 amps per month in order to maintain high quality standards. During this time, Hiwatt's line of "All Purpose Amplifiers" included the 50-watt DR504, 100-watt DR103, 200-watt DR201, and 400-watt DR405, along with the NCA 108, a 195-watt solid-state amp with a five-band graphic equalizer and built-in fuzz-style distortion effect unit.

Reeves died in 1981 from an accidental fall down a staircase. At the time, Reeves was in divorce proceedings and the company passed into the control of lawyers rather than Reeves' children, as he had intended.

==== Descendant companies ====
After Reeves' death, several Hiwatt employees incorporated as Biacrown Ltd. and continued producing Hiwatt-style amplifiers with minor circuit changes until 1984, when the company folded for financial reasons. The Hiwatt name was later sold to Music Ground in the U.K., while Hiwatt reemerged as a subsidiary of Fernandes Guitars in the United States. On both sides of the Atlantic, Hiwatt amps were subjected to cost-cutting measures that hurt the brand's previously-sterling reputation for quality, which in turn caused Reeves-era models to be more prized on the vintage market. Several manufacturers have since been formed by enthusiasts of vintage Hiwatts to build their own versions to the previous era's specs. Notably, in 2006, Clayton Callaway and Mark Huss partnered with Reeves' son Glynn to found Hi-Tone Amplification in Columbus, Indiana to faithfully recreate Hiwatt-style amps to the production standards of the original brand. In 2018, Andrei Nicula purchased the rights to the Hylight name to manufacture new versions of Hiwatt's amps.

== Characteristics ==
A 1972 Hiwatt DR103 used on stage by David Gilmour

When Reeves founded Hiwatt, his goal was to make the highest-quality large amplifiers that he could. This notably involved using military spec components and wiring and custom Partridge transformers that were larger than almost anything in use for guitar amplification at the time. Reeves mounted the components to a single, heavy-duty turret board with point-to-point construction and a "fluid, logical" signal flow that allowed for easier assessment and repair, while the noise floor was kept low through techniques like shielding more of the internal cable runs than other amp manufacturers were doing.

Outwardly, Hiwatt's amps bore some similarities to Marshall's. Both had four inputs—high and low sensitivity inputs for two channels (Normal and Brilliant for Hiwatt)—and both used a shared Bass/Middle/Treble/Presence format Marshall itself had adopted from the Fender Bassman. Internally though, the circuit differed significantly. The tone stack was implemented in an entirely different part of the circuit compared to Marshalls and Fenders, and despite the Hiwatt emphasis on high-powered clean tones, Hiwatts used four gain stages compared to the three used in popular Fender and Marshall topologies of the day, with much different capacitor values in almost every position within the circuit. Such high capacitor values in the power section contributed to Hiwatts having their characteristic fuller-frequency sound. Like the Marshall Super Lead, most Hiwatts used EL34 power tubes, but again, the end result was much different, thanks in large part to Hiwatt using an ECC81 (12AT7) phase inverter tube, which provided more clean headroom for the power section. Not all Hiwatts used EL34s however: later DR201s switched from six EL34s to four KT88s, while the DR405 used six KT88s. KT88 tubes provide more low end frequencies, which made these higher-wattage amps well-suited for bass guitar. In their cabinets, Hiwatt used 50-watt, 12" Fane speakers, which were an important element of the brand's characteristic sound, providing a chimey quality reminiscent of Vox's "Blue" speakers.

Hiwatts have long been associated with big, punchy clean tones, with a more refined and detailed character and faster response than other British brands. But they could produce distortion when the output stage is pushed hard enough, easing "from a tactile crunch into chewy roar." Premier Guitar wrote that playing "a cranked vintage Hiwatt stack is not for the faint of heart: Burly sounds lunge from the cabs almost instantaneously, revealing every detail and nuance of pick attack and fretwork. The classic Hiwatt tone is an exquisite blend of muscle and musicality." Many guitarists who prefer Hiwatts consider them, and not Marshall, the quintessential "big British rock sound."

== Players ==
- Martin Barre of Jethro Tull
- Glenn Cornick of Jethro Tull
- John Entwistle of the Who
- Robert Fripp of King Crimson
- David Gilmour of Pink Floyd
- Steve Harris of Iron Maiden
- Jimmy Page of Led Zeppelin
- Keith Richards of the Rolling Stones
- Mike Rutherford of Genesis
- Tommy Shaw of Styx
- Mick Taylor of the Rolling Stones
- Pete Townshend of the Who
- Ronnie Wood of the Small Faces
- Bill Wyman of the Rolling Stones

== See also ==
- The Who's musical equipment
