= The Who's musical equipment =

This is a history of the equipment that the English rock band The Who used. It also notes their influence on the instruments of the time period.

As their sound developed with each album, and their audience expanded with each tour, John Entwistle and Pete Townshend, supported by their sound engineer, Bob Pridden, became known for constantly changing their stage equipment. Townshend altered his setup for nearly every tour, and Entwistle's equipment changed even more than that. Keith Moon played various drum kits, recognizably the 'Pictures of Lily' kit, manufactured by Premier Percussion, which consisted of one and a half kits' worth of equipment as a precaution towards his tendency to destroy parts onstage.

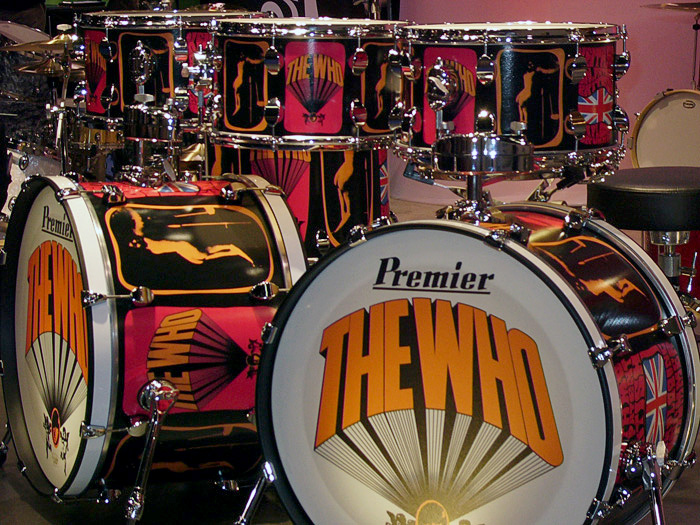
Premier's replica of the classic "Pictures of Lily" Keith Moon's drumkit

== Early rigs and Marshall Stacks ==
In 1965, Pete Townshend and John Entwistle were directly responsible for the creation and widespread use of Marshall amplifiers powering stacked speaker cabinets. In fact, the first 100 watt Marshall amps (called "Superleads") were created specifically for Entwistle and Townshend when they wanted an amplifier that sounded like a Fender head but with much more power.

At this time, The Who were using their own precursors to the Marshall Stack with 50 watt amps; John Entwistle used a Marshall JTM45 head feeding two 4x12" cabinets (set up side-by-side), and Townshend had a 1964 Fender Bassman powering a single 4x12" Marshall cabinet set up on top of a second cab. Around this time, Eric Clapton was using a JTM45, which he had modified into the 1962 Bluesbreaker combo. These rigs proved not to be loud enough for The Who as they moved into bigger and bigger venues, and in the summer of 1965 they switched to Vox AC100s; the very first (and at the time, only) 100w amps on the market, which were designed for use by The Beatles. However, in September that year, The Who's van was stolen, including all of their equipment.

Following the theft, unhappy with the sound and reliability of the Vox amps, Entwistle and Townshend approached Jim Marshall asking if it would be possible for him to make new Marshall amps for them that were more powerful than the JTM45, to which they were told that the cabinets would have to double in size. They agreed and six rigs of this 8x12 prototype were manufactured, of which two each were sold to Townshend and Entwistle and one each to Ronnie Lane and Steve Marriott of The Small Faces. These new "double" cabinets proved too heavy and awkward to be transported practically, so Townshend returned to Marshall asking if they could be cut in half and stacked like his old Bassman rig, and although the double cabinets were left intact, the existing single cabinet models were modified to make them more suitable for stacking, which has become the standard over the years.

Entwistle and Townshend continued expanding and experimenting with their rigs, until (at a time when most bands still used 50–100w amplifiers with single cabinets) they were both using twin Stacks, with each Stack being driven by the then-new and experimental 200w prototype Marshall Majors. This, in turn, also had a strong influence on the band's contemporaries at the time, with Cream and The Jimi Hendrix Experience both following suit. However, due to the cost of transport, The Who could not afford to take their full rigs with them for their earliest overseas tours; thus, Cream and Hendrix were the first to be seen to use this setup on a wide scale, particularly in America.

Ironically, although The Who pioneered and directly contributed to the development of the "classic" Marshall sound and setup with their equipment being built and tweaked to their personal specifications, by the time they toured America as headliners in 1968, they had stopped using Marshalls and moved on to Sound City equipment, which were as powerful as Marshalls, but had a cleaner sound, which both Townshend and Entwistle preferred. Cream and particularly Hendrix would be associated with the adoption of Marshall stacks.

== Sound City and the invention of Hiwatt amplifiers ==
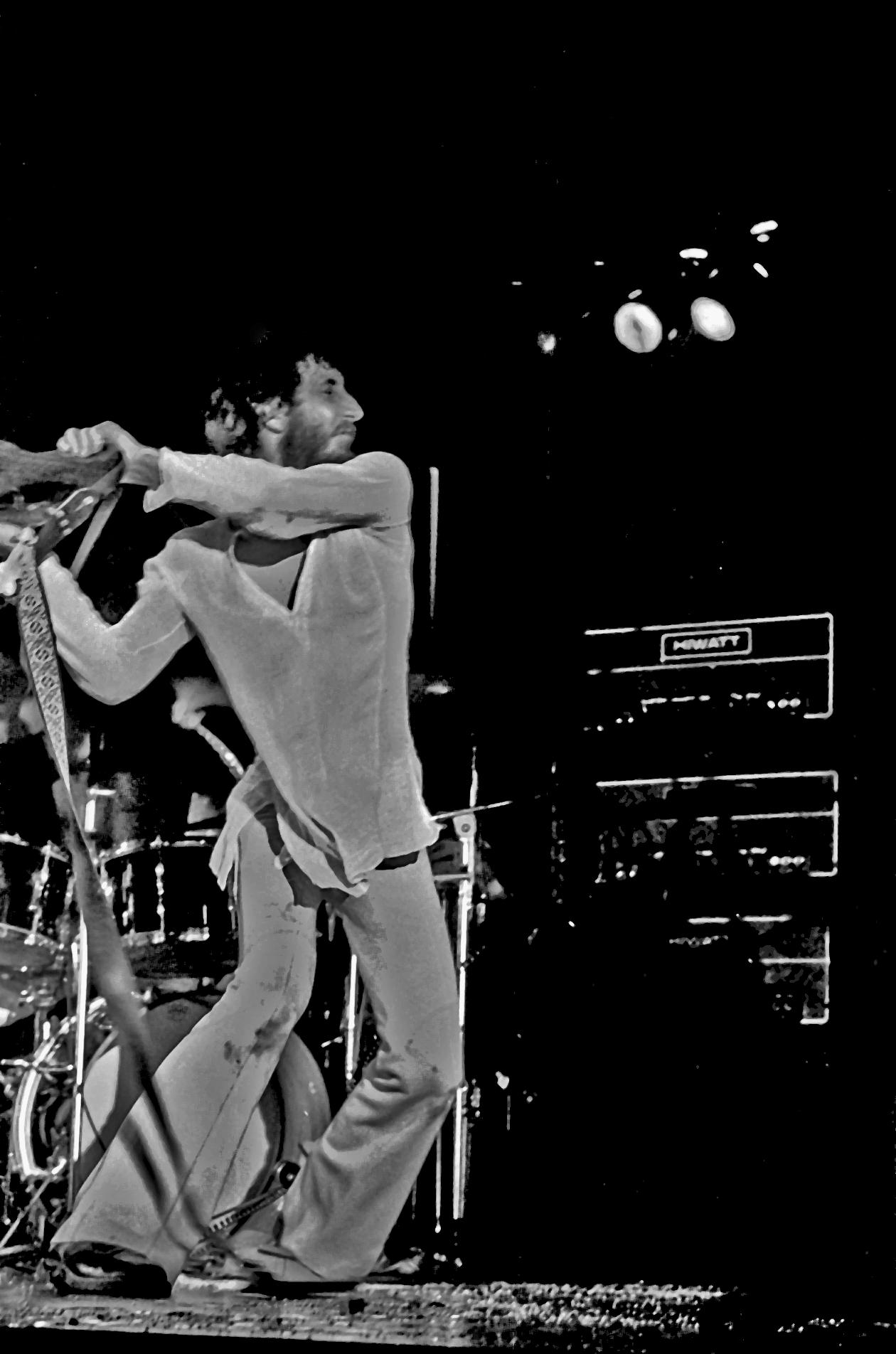
Pete Townshend smashing a Gibson SG. Behind him are a set of Hiwatt amps. Both were a staple ingredient of The Who's sound between 1969 and 1972.

John Entwistle traded in his Marshall Stacks in favour of Sound City at the beginning of 1967, and Townshend followed later that year.

Around this time, Jimi Hendrix and his manager Chas Chandler approached Townshend asking for his opinion on amplification. He told them that he had stopped using Marshall as he thought Sound City were better. The Jimi Hendrix Experience subsequently started using Sound City rigs, but set them up together with their Marshall Stacks instead of replacing them.

In late 1968 The Who approached Sound City owner Dallas Arbiter with a request for Sound City amplifiers with slight modifications. Arbiter declined the request, but Dave Reeves, whose company Hylight Electronics had manufactured Sound City amplifiers, agreed and created customised Sound City L100 amplifiers. This model evolved into the Hiwatt CP103 (not to be confused with the standard Hiwatt DR103- a completely different tone circuit). In 1973, a DR103W model was created (a CP103 tone circuit with different panel layout).

Since the early 1990s, Pete Townshend has relied on Fender Vibroking amps with 212 extension cabinets. At times a Fender Custom Vibrolux Reverb or a Lazy J were added, or, for a brief period in 2006, a Hiwatt Custom 50.

The Who mention Hiwatt amplifiers in the song "Long Live Rock".

== Rotosound strings ==
In 1966, bassist John Entwistle was looking for a set of roundwound strings "which vibrated properly". He contacted James How of Rotosound and set up a meeting to visit their factory in London. Entwistle spent the afternoon there, trying various strings made for him by the on-site technicians in different gauges with different cores and types of wire until they found a set that he was happy with.

In return for a free lifetime's supply, Entwistle agreed to allow Rotosound to market the strings they had co-developed as their flagship "Swing Bass 66" range, with a black-and-white photograph of John and James How on that day in the Rotosound factory gracing the reverse of every packet.

In honour of the partnership, The Who wrote and recorded a jingle for Rotosound which appears on their 1967 album The Who Sell Out.

Entwistle used these strings exclusively for the next twenty-three years until switching to gold-plated Maxima strings in 1989. In 2001 he switched back to using Rotosound until his death in June 2002.
