= Rangemaster =

Rangemaster may refer to:

- Rangemaster, a stove manufacturer owned by the Aga Rangemaster Group
- Dallas Rangemaster, a treble booster
- Rangemaster, an overseer of a shooting range
- Ryan Rangemaster, a late model version of the Ryan Navion airplane.
