= Laney Amplification =

British audio equipment manufacturer

- Company type: Private
- Industry: Amplification
- Founded: Birmingham, England (1967; 59 years ago)
- Founder: Lyndon Laney (CEO)
- Headquarters: Halesowen, England
- Area served: Europe, Africa, Asia, North America, South America, Australia
- Products: Amplifiers
- Owner: Headstock Group (Headstock Distribution)
- Website: Laney.co.uk

Laney Amplification is a British designer and manufacturer of guitar amplifiers, bass guitar amplifiers, cabinets, and public address systems, selling them exclusively through a network of distributors and retailers.

== History ==
Laney Amplification was founded in 1967 by Lyndon Laney while playing bass guitar in Band of Joy. Lyndon's intense interest in electronics, paired with his lack of funds to purchase a proper amplifier, led to his building what would become the first Laney amp in his father's garage. As word spread of the tone supplied by Lyndon's amplifiers, he was able to supplement his income with amp sales to many local musicians, including Tony Iommi of Black Sabbath.

When the Laney signature tone was heard on Black Sabbath's debut album in 1970, demand became too high for the new company's manufacturing facilities. Laney began manufacturing in the Digbeth quarter of Birmingham temporarily, but ultimately settled in Cradley Heath, where they stayed until 2004 when they again moved to larger facilities in Halesowen.

From the late ‘60s through much of the ‘70s, Laney focused primarily on their flagship LA100BL model amplifier and their KLIPP series amplifiers. The KLIPP series integrated a treble booster, similar to the Dallas Rangemaster used by countless rock and blues guitarists of the day.

As the 1980s began, there was an increased demand for overdrive and gain from amplifier manufacturers. Laney entered the market with their AOR (Advanced Overdrive Response) series, offering an extra gain stage built in. This was particularly innovative as competitors such as Marshall would require extensive modification to achieve this sound. These amps were popular with such players as Randy Rhoads, Vinnie Moore, George Lynch, and Ace Frehley. Since the early ‘90s, these AOR amps have become a staple of the stoner rock and doom metal tone palette.

The 1990s found Laney building on their reputation for innovation with such products as the VC line of amps, which were combo units reminiscent of the Vox AC series, but with built in effects and advanced features. Their now classic VH100R, as well as the GH50L and GH100L head units were also introduced during this time period, gaining acclaim with such devotees as Paul Gilbert, Andy Timmons, John 5, and Joe Satriani. Laney also introduced Tony Iommi’s first signature amplifier, the GH100TI, in 1995.

Since 2000, Laney has introduced several new products, including the TT series, which combined the sounds of their classic rock heads with modern MIDI integration. Also introduced were the NEXUS series bass amplifiers, the retro styled Lionheart range, and the CUB series of lower wattage, economy amplifiers.

In 2012 Laney introduced the new Tony Iommi signature amplifier series, which includes a 100-watt head, 4x12” cabinet, and a 15-watt 1x12” combo unit. They also unveiled their Ironheart series, which caters to metal guitarists.

In early 2016 Laney Amplification produced several reproductions of its flagship LA100BL amplifier at the request of Tony Iommi and his guitar Tech Mike Clement. 13 amplifiers were reproduced in honor of Black Sabbath's 13 album. These reproduction amplifiers were used on Black Sabbath's "The End" Tour in 2016 for the older songs that were originally recorded using the Laney LA100BL amplifiers.

On April 13th 2026, it was announced that Lyndon Laney had passed away.
