= Moving iron speaker =

Early loudspeaker

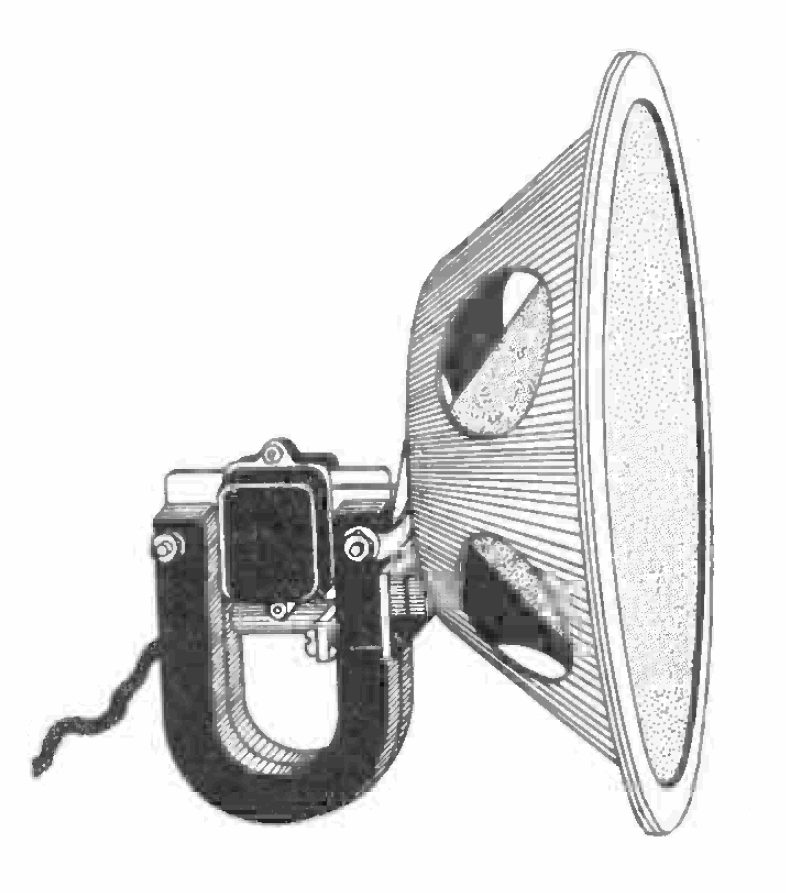
Moving iron speaker

Moving iron sounder

The moving iron speaker was the earliest type of electric loudspeaker. They are still used today in some miniature speakers where small size and low cost are more important than sound quality. A moving iron speaker consists of a ferrous-metal diaphragm or reed, a permanent magnet and a coil of insulated wire. The coil is wound around the permanent magnet to form a solenoid. When an audio signal is applied to the coil, the strength of the magnetic field varies, and the springy diaphragm or reed moves in response to the varying force on it. The moving iron loudspeaker Bell telephone receiver was of this form. Large units had a paper cone attached to a ferrous metal reed.

There are several types of moving iron speaker. Modern damped moving iron mechanisms can provide respectable sound quality, and are used in headphones.

The first moving iron transducer, the telephone receiver or earphone, evolved with the first telephone systems in the 1870s. Moving iron horn loudspeakers developed from earphones after the first amplifying device which could drive a speaker, the triode vacuum tube, was perfected around 1913. They were used in radio receivers and the first public address systems. Moving iron cone loudspeakers appeared around 1920. Around 1930 they were replaced by the moving coil cone loudspeaker developed in 1925 by Edward Kellogg and Chester Rice. Today the moving iron driver mechanism is still used in some earphones, appliances, and tiny PC speakers.

== Design ==
There are several variations. Each speaker has one property from each of the following groups of characteristics:

- Means of restraint of the moving member:
  - Diaphragm
  - Springy metal reed
- Acoustic loading:
  - Cone
  - Disc
  - Horn
  - Resonant chamber
  - None
- Drive method:
  - Single ended drive
  - Balanced armature
  - Inductor dynamic
- Damping:
  - Yes
  - No

=== Restraint ===
==== Diaphragm ====
Diaphragm type speakers use a thin semi-flexible iron disc held at its outer rim. The disc is centrally driven, bending back and forth under magnetic force. It is only practical to make small drivers with this technology, large diaphragms have too much mass, and hence inertia, for passable frequency response.

This has remained a popular type of transducer design, being used in:

- Early (pre-war) headphones
- Pre-war horn loaded loudspeakers
- Some budget modern headphones
- Most telephone earpieces until the early 1980s
- Miniature bleepers

Poor bandwidth and modest output are limitations of most of these devices.

==== Reed ====
Reed mechanisms use a flat strip of spring steel anchored at one end, the other end moved by the magnetic field from the voice coil. The reed moves a cone or pleated paper diaphragm.

=== Acoustic loading ===
Cone
Cone loading is more or less always used with sprung mechanisms. The combination of these two features permits a less rigid fixing of the driven member, permitting more movement. The cone is also better able to handle lower frequencies compared to a table-top sized horn. Consequently, these speakers have better bass response than small horn speakers. Spring force restrains the moving iron. The downside of greater movement is greater non-linearity, thus higher distortion. Paper cone loaded moving iron speakers were in use pre-war. These suffered some noticeable issues: The magnetic gap was usually manually adjustable to give good sensitivity at any given output volume. Misadjustment was thus common. The iron sometimes stuck to the magnet if overdriven or misadjusted. The result was a loud 'whack' followed by near silence. Loud bass notes caused end-stopping. Unlike modern speakers, which are designed to produce soft end-stopping, the iron in these hitting the pole piece made a noisy resonant chattering sound.
Disc
Less popular were paper disc loaded speakers. These required an outer frame to hold the disc. They worked similarly to cone speakers, but since the outside of the disc moved less than the centre, the disc had to be a lot larger to achieve the same volume and bass output. An example of this type is the Sterling Primax. The disc is pleated for rigidity.
Horn
Horns were normally driven by diaphragm type drivers. The problem with horns is that reasonable bass response requires impractical horn size, and the table-top sized horns popular on pre-war speakers were thus very short on bass response. In fact they were nearly devoid of it. Diaphragm driven horn speakers have been used in more modern times as midrange squawkers and tweeters, frequency ranges which they are capable of handling properly if suitably designed. However early speakers attempted to cover as much of the audio range as possible with one unit, making high frequency response very poor as well as at low frequencies.
Chamber loading
Bleepers use a resonant chamber to increase sound output. This sacrifices bandwidth for sound pressure level (SPL). Such units are not suitable for speech. Such units are smaller and cheaper than their main competitor piezo sounders.
No Loading
Moving iron transducers used in headphones normally have no attached loading (no cone, horn or disc). The volume output from these is sufficient for headphone use.

=== Drive method ===
Single ended drive
Early speakers were usually single ended drive. This simple method of operation produced copious amounts of second harmonic and intermodulation distortion.
Balanced armature
Balanced armature moving iron speakers were developed in an attempt to reduce the high distortion levels of single ended drive speakers. Their success was mixed, as although they did reduce the percentage of distortion, they changed that distortion from even harmonic distortion to odd, making the distortion more unpleasant in some respects.
Inductor dynamic speaker
These enjoyed brief success in the 1920s but were quickly eclipsed by moving coil speakers. The inductor dynamic speaker solved the nonlinearity problem of earlier moving iron types, providing a more pleasant listening experience. The main defect of ID speakers was very poor treble response, giving them a characteristic dull drone. Inductor dynamic moving iron speakers are now rare. Moving coil mechanisms provide better sound quality without the assorted downsides of moving iron, and eclipsed the inductor dynamic shortly after its introduction.

=== Damping ===
A lot of moving iron speakers have no damping. This means the moving member resonates freely in the audio band. This reduces sound quality, but introducing damping heavily reduces sensitivity. This was impractical in pre-war times when amplification was very expensive, so moving iron has a history of being used with no damping.

Modern headphones that use this technology incorporate damping to greatly improve sound quality. The reduced sensitivity isn't a problem with modern equipment.

== Impedance ==
These speakers present an inductive load, so speaker impedance is proportional to frequency, with deviation from this proportionality at low frequency due to winding resistance, and at high frequency due to inter-winding capacitance.

It is normal for such speakers to vary in impedance by over 100:1 across the audio spectrum.

The result of this is that even very approximate impedance matching to an amplifier is impossible. This has a major effect on frequency response, and the amplifier must be able to tolerate a very low impedance load at low frequencies.

Such devices can be used on valve (vacuum tube) amplifiers, but if used with transistors some precaution to prevent overcurrent at low frequency is often necessary, such as a series resistor or capacitor. Alternatively the amplifier can be chosen to be able to drive the speaker resistance (the low frequency impedance), but this will result in worse impedance mismatch and thus output power far below the amplifier design specification.

== Defects ==
Undamped moving iron speakers suffer the following defects:

- Gross non-linearity and consequent harmonic distortion
- Heavy intermodulation distortion
- Little bass response
- Poor treble response
- Strong undamped resonance at a few kHz
- Gross impedance mismatch
- Prone to demagnetisation

Antique pre-war moving iron speakers also suffered the following defects:

- With cone speakers, tendency of the moving iron to stick to the pole piece, resulting in a 'whack' sound followed by very little sound output.
- Noisy chattering when presented with a loud bass note
- Need for adjustment
- Horn loudspeakers (popular at the time) were directional

== Uses ==
Impedance
Early moving iron speakers were normally high impedance, being designed to be connected directly to the output triode with no transformer or dc blocking. Quality and output level can be significantly improved by removing most bass from the electrical input signal. This is simply achieved by using a capacitor in series with the speaker. Table-top horns can only reproduce the highest of bass frequencies, so no noticeable bass is lost by removing most of the bass input. This reduces diaphragm or reed excursion, reducing harmonic and intermodulation distortion.
Polarity
Polarity matters when dc is present in the speaker. Wrong polarity weakens the magnetic field, and can sometimes demagnetise the permanent magnet, leaving the speaker non-functional. When powered with ac only, polarity is a non-issue. Nearly all modern amplifiers feed only ac to the speakers. However, when using a moving iron speaker on an early radio, dc is usually present, and either the polarity marked on the speaker should be observed, or means used to remove the dc component from the speaker. This was often done with a choke and capacitor.
Headphones
Use of balanced armature mechanisms is common in modern headphones. These use damping to achieve satisfactory sound.
Simple intercoms
Moving iron diaphragm transducers are highly microphonic, and connecting two together with no amplifier makes a usable intercom.

== See also ==
- Antique radio
