= Fuzz Face =

Guitar Effect Pedal

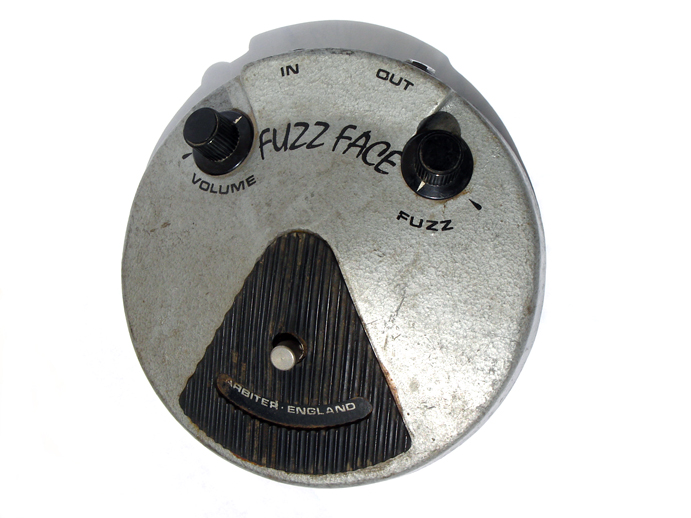
- Arbiter Fuzz Face, ca. 1967
- Brand: Arbiter, Crest Audio, Dunlop
- Dates: 1966—1975 (Arbiter) Late 1970s–1990 (Crest Audio) 1993–present (Dunlop)

Technical specifications
- Effects type: Fuzz pedal

Controls
- Pedal control: Volume, Fuzz

Input/output
- Inputs: Mono
- Outputs: Mono

The Fuzz Face is a fuzz-style distortion pedal designed for electric guitar by Ivor Arbiter and released in 1966. Arbiter based his design on the Tone Bender MK1.5 circuit, offering a low-budget, low-component alternative to the popular Maestro Fuzz-Tone FZ-1. The Fuzz Face used a characteristically round case with two controls—for Volume and Fuzz—and a semi-circular logo below the footswitch, all of which combined to resemble a smiling face. Jimi Hendrix became a prominent Fuzz Face user early on, preferring it over the FZ-1 due to the Fuzz Face's much lower price, despite the latter's numerous technical problems and inconsistency in tone from one unit to another. Arbiter discontinued the pedal in 1975 and reissues were subsequently offered by Crest Audio. Dunlop bought the rights to the Fuzz Face in 1993 and has since made multiple versions of the pedal with more reliable components.

Silicon Fuzz Face into clean Fender amp
Silicon Fuzz Face clone into a clean Fender amp simulation.

Silicon Fuzz Face into crunch Vox amp (playing with the volume knob)
Silicon Fuzz Face clone into a crunchy Vox amp simulation. Notice the dynamics in the gain when volume knob is rolled back.

Fuzz Face and wah
Silicon Fuzz Face clone into a Crybaby wah into tube distortion (velcro fuzz tone)

Fuzz Face overloading tube distortion
Silicon Fuzz Face clone into a Blackstar HT Dual. When the volume pot is on 10, the fuzz "overloads" the overdrive (velcro fuzz tone).

== History ==
In 1962, Maestro released the music industry's first "fuzz" effects pedal, the Fuzz-Tone, which was used on recordings like the Ventures' "The 2,000 Pound Bee" and the Rolling Stones' "(I Can't Get No) Satisfaction". By the mid-1960s, Fuzz-Tones were rare and expensive in London, where Ivor Arbiter owned a drum shop. Arbiter wished to make an alternative fuzz pedal for the low-budget market using as few parts as possible. The pedal he designed, the Fuzz Face, offered two controls, for Volume and Fuzz, and was built with a circular case inspired by a microphone stand. Optional colors included red, black, and silver. These design choices marked a significant departure from the rest of the industry, which largely relied on plain, boxy designs for effects pedals.

Arbiter released his Fuzz Face in 1966, advertising it as "the new fuzz box from Arbiter giving the ultimate in controlled effects." The Fuzz Face originally retailed for six pounds, compared to the Fuzz-Tone's thirty. The earliest units used germanium transistors. Less expensive silicon transistors were used in later editions of the pedal, with silicon transistors creating a different, harsher sound

Arbiter discontinued the Fuzz Face in 1975. Reissues were released in the late-1970s and late-1980s through Crest Audio of New Jersey, producing about 2000 Fuzz Faces up until 1990. In 1993, Dunlop Manufacturing bought the rights to the Fuzz Face and took over production. The brand has since released several germanium and silicon models, while in 2013 smaller versions with status LEDs and AC power jacks were introduced.

In the late 1990s, Arbiter reissued the pedal.

== Design ==
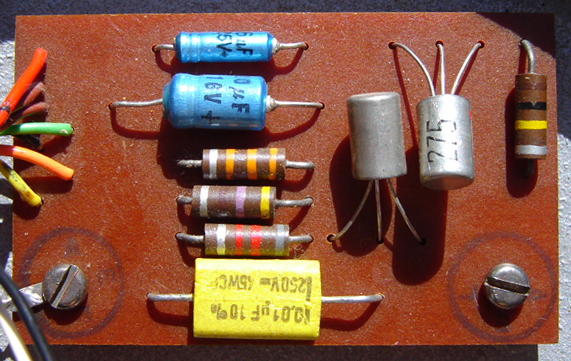
Inside view of a Fuzz Face pedal showing its comparatively simple two-transistor circuit board, in this model a pair of germanium NKT275

Designed for the budget market, the Fuzz Face used as few parts as possible: two transistors, three capacitors, two potentiometers, and a bypass switch. The first units fitted the circuit into the round base of a microphone stand, and a sand-cast, circular case became standard. The logo initially used the text "Arbiter England," but this was changed on later units to "Dallas-Arbiter England."

Early Fuzz Faces used NKT275 or AC128 germanium transistors, which created a fuller tone with less gain and less noise. A major issue with germanium Fuzz Faces was their susceptibility to temperature variations because of Arbiter's "crude" biasing and low component count. Mike "AnalogMan" Piera, designer of the King of Tone, said there is little that can be done about this, as these germanium transistors invariably sound worse as they heat up; as a result, many studios refrigerate early Fuzz Faces before recording with them.

Arbiter switched to cheaper silicon transistors when they became available in the late 1960s. While some players found these new versions sounded harsh, silicon transistors could be produced with more consistent tolerances, which improved the circuit's reliability. Silicon versions however suffered from issues such the ability to pick up AM radio signals. According to Hendrix's guitar tech Roger Mayer, Hendrix would buy half a dozen Fuzz Faces at a time and mark the one he liked best only to find out that he did not like it in a different environment.

Despite popular belief that Arbiter used randomly selected pairs of transistors, Dennis Cornell, one of the engineers who worked for Arbiter in the 1960s, described in a 2016 Guitarist magazine article how he auditioned them for their sonic properties.

== Use ==
The Fuzz Face's continuing popularity and status as a classic may be explained by its many famous users, which include Jimi Hendrix, David Gilmour, Duane Allman, Stevie Ray Vaughan, Pete Townshend, Eric Johnson, George Harrison, and Kevin Parker.

The Fuzz Face has a very low input impedance and interacts with the guitar's pickups and volume control. Setting the guitar's volume to 10 with the Fuzz Face connected causes noteable treble and signal loss to the pickup. Rolling the volume control on the guitar down stops this behaviour, and restores the pickup's treble response. For the same reason, Fuzz Face pedals react differently when placed directly after the guitar than when after other pedals or after a buffer amplifier.

While some claim Wah-wah pedals are known to be troublesome with Fuzz Faces, artists such as Hendrix were known to use them together to spectacular effect. His signal flow for live performance involved first plugging his guitar into a wah-wah pedal, then connecting the wah-wah pedal to a Fuzz Face, which was then linked to a Uni-Vibe, before connecting to a Marshall amplifier.

== See also ==
- List of distortion pedals
