= Hayman drums =

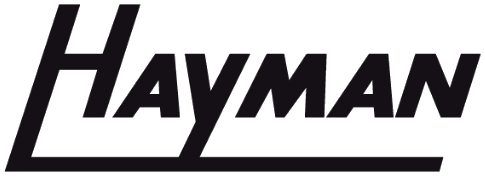
- Founded: 1968; 58 years ago
- Defunct: 1975; 51 years ago
- Headquarters: England
- Key people: Ivor Arbiter, Founder

Hayman drums was an English manufacturer of percussion instruments established in 1968. The company was founded by Ivor Arbiter with the help of the John E. Dallas Company whom sought to compete with American drum manufacturers. The company went defunct in 1975, although attempts to re-launch the brand have led to the drums being produced intermittently in small batches by Taiwanese manufacturers.
