= Antique radio =

Vintage telecommunication audio receiver

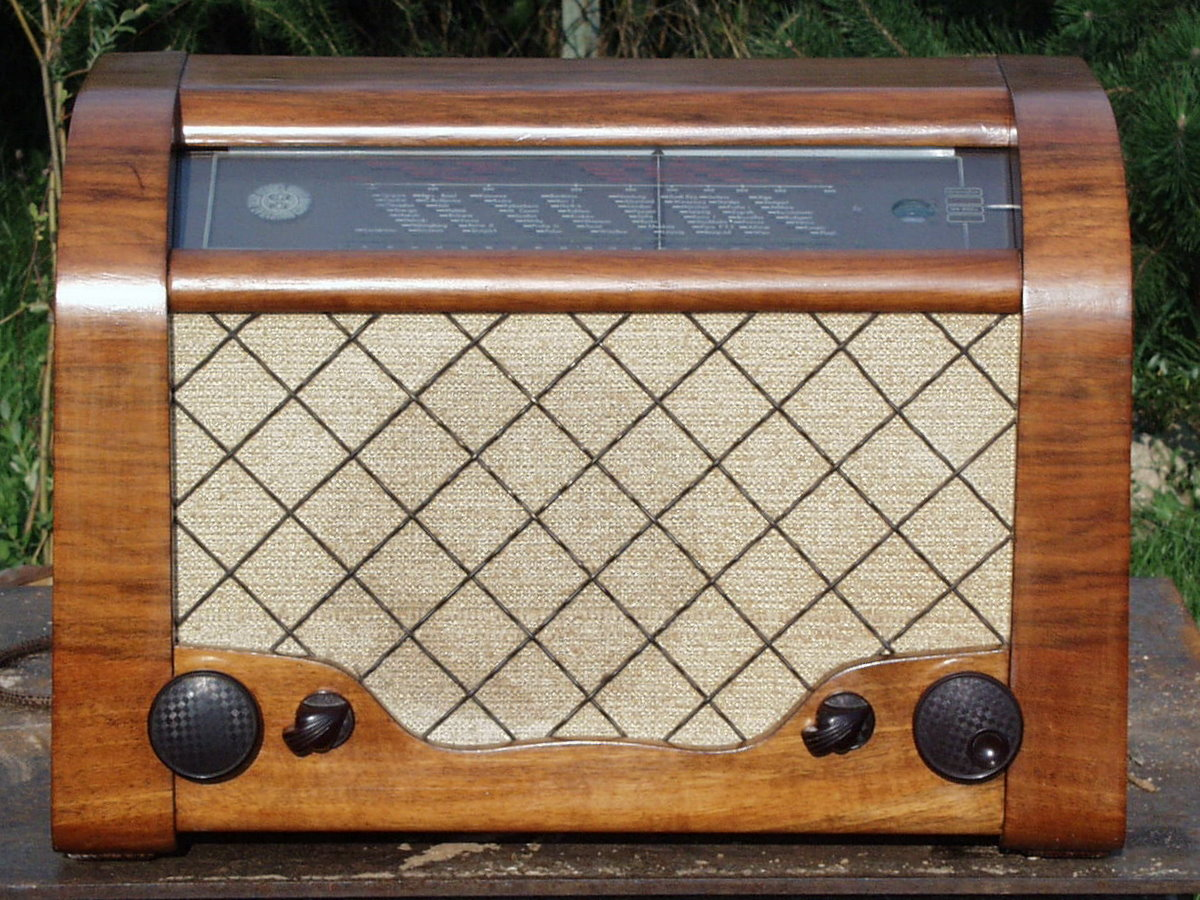
DIORA AGA RSZ-50 ca.1947 from Poland

An antique radio is a radio receiving set that is collectible because of its age and rarity.

== Types of antique radio ==
=== Morse receivers ===
The first radio receivers used a coherer and sounding board, and were only able to receive continuous wave (CW) transmissions, encoded with Morse code (wireless telegraphy). Later transmission and reception of speech became possible, although Morse code transmission continued in use until the 1990s.

All the following sections concern speech-capable radio, or wireless telephony.

=== Early home-made sets ===
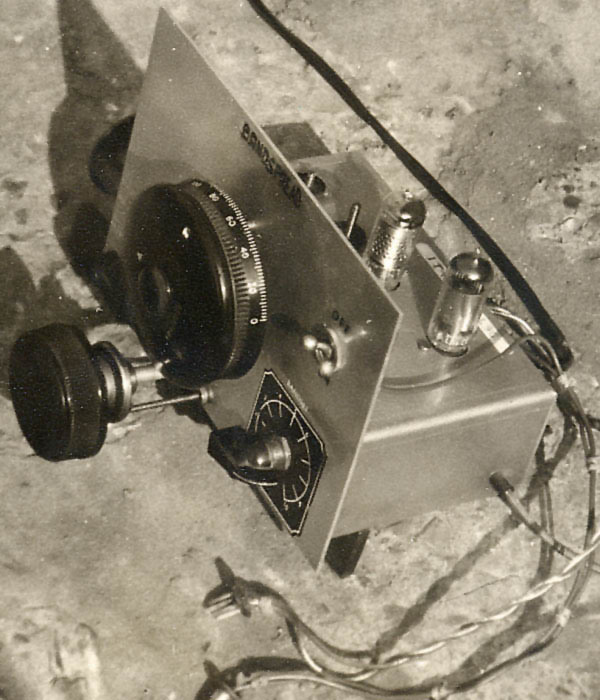
Homemade two tube radio from 1958

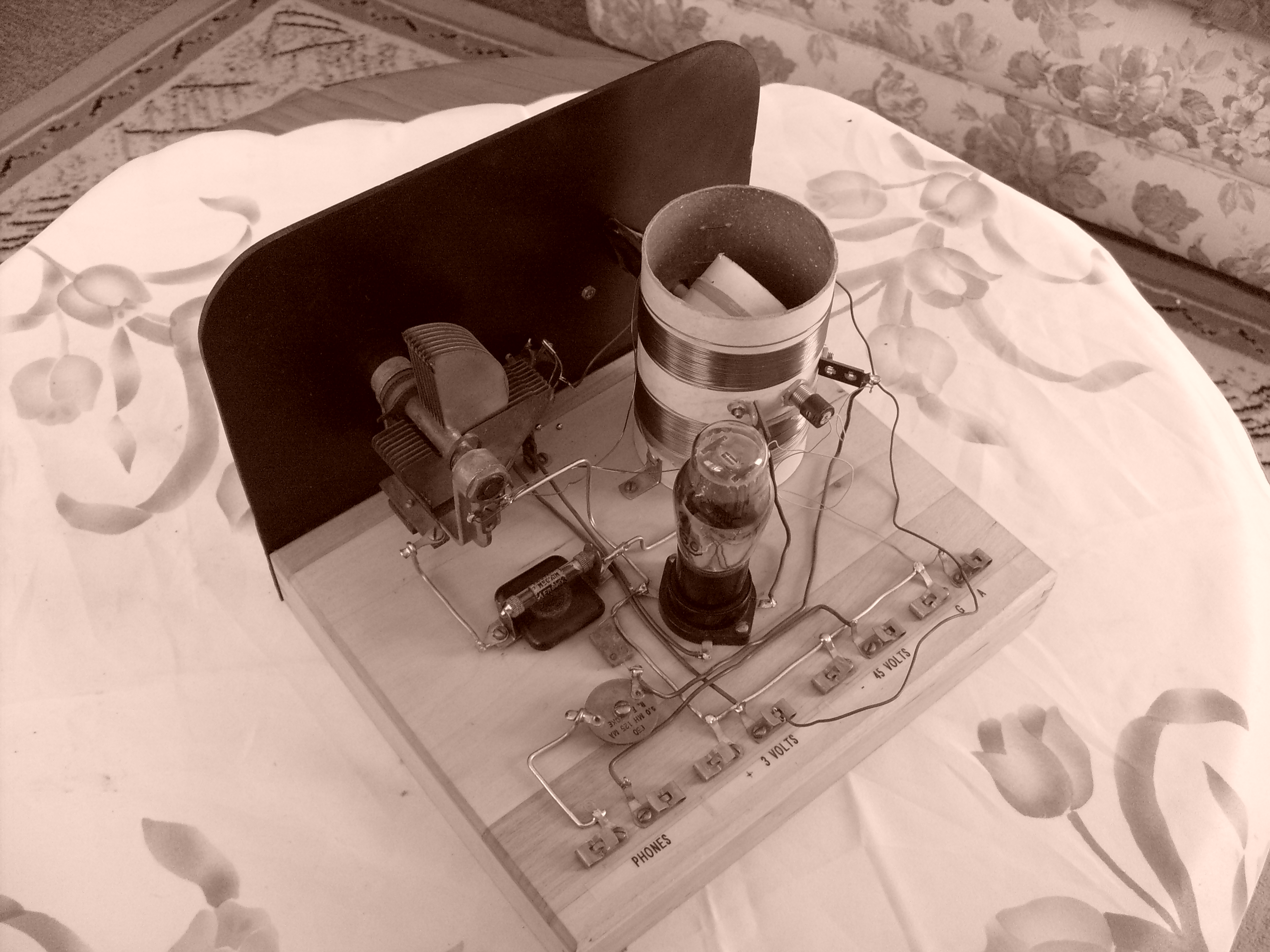
1930s style homemade one-tube regenerative radio

The idea of radio as entertainment took off in 1920, with the opening of the first stations established specifically for broadcast to the public such as KDKA in Pittsburgh and WWJ in Detroit. More stations opened in cities across North America in the following years and radio ownership steadily gained in popularity. Radio sets from before 1920 are rarities, and are probably military artifacts. Sets made prior to approximately 1924 were usually made on wooden breadboards, in small cupboard style cabinets, or sometimes on an open sheet metal chassis. Homemade sets remained a strong sector of radio production until the early 1930s. Until then there were more homemade sets in use than commercial sets.

Early sets used any of the following technologies:

- Crystal set
- Crystal set with carbon or mechanical amplifier
- Basic Tuned Radio Frequency (TRF) Sets
- Reaction Sets
- Super-Regenerative Receiver
- Superheterodyne Receiver

==== Crystal sets ====
These basic radios used no battery, had no amplification and could operate only high-impedance headphones. They would receive only very strong signals from a local station. They were popular among the less wealthy due to their low build cost and zero run cost. Crystal sets had minimal ability to separate stations, and where more than one high power station was present, inability to receive one without the other was a common problem.

Some crystal set users added a carbon amplifier or a mechanical turntable amplifier to give enough output to operate a speaker. Some even used a flame amplifier.

==== Tuned radio frequency sets ====
Tuned radio frequency sets (TRF sets) were the most popular class of early radio, primarily because the Radio Corporation of America (RCA) had a monopoly on the superheterodyne circuit patents and it was more profitable for companies to jump into radio manufacturing TRF sets. These used several valves (tubes) to provide RF amplification, detection, and audio amplification. Early TRF sets only operated headphones, but by the mid-1920s it was more common to use additional amplification to power a loudspeaker, despite the expense. The sound quality produced from "moving-iron" speakers used on such sets is sometimes described as torturous, although by the late 1920s the Kellogg-Rice dynamic (moving-coil) speaker had begun to find favor due to its superior sound-reproduction ability.

Speakers widely used on TRF sets included:

- Moving iron speaker (horn or cone)
- tin can, magnet & wire based speakers
- moving coil speaker

TRF sets used no regeneration, and were merely several stages (typically three) of tuned RF amplifiers in series feeding a detector tube which extracted the audio intelligence from the RF signal. TRF sets, depending on the number of stages they employed, could have poor-to-superb sensitivity (ability of the set to pick up faint signals) and corresponding selectivity (ability to parse adjacent stations from one another). Audio reproduction quality of TRF sets was limited by the available loudspeakers. "High Fidelity" was not to become a radio marketing concept until the mid-1930s and was not realized until the advent of FM broadcasting.

Reaction sets, also known as regenerative receivers, rely on positive feedback to achieve adequate gain. This approach provided high performance with a minimum number of expensive vacuum tubes, but these receivers tended to radiate RF interference in their immediate vicinity. Consequently, there was a significant amount of hostility by neighbors of "regen" set users over maladjusted radios transmitting squealing noises and blocking reception on nearby properties.

Early TRF sets had typically two or three tuning knobs and tube filament voltage-control rheostats, all of which had to be set correctly to receive a station. Later (late 1920s) TRF sets had ganged tuning (one knob was used to control all stage tuning capacitors simultaneously), AC house current operation, and eliminated the filament voltage adjustments. All of these changes greatly simplified operation and made radio a household appliance that even a small child could operate, instead of the highly skilled hobbyists of the brief preceding generation. Reaction sets also had the filament adjustment rheostats for each valve, and again settings had to be right to achieve reception.

==== Superheterodyne receivers ====
In the era of early radio, only RCA and a select number of competing "prestige" radio manufacturers could afford to build a superheterodyne receiver (superhet). RCA had exclusive rights to the superheterodyne circuit patents and extracted high licensing fees from other companies who sought to build superhet sets. RCA also vigorously prosecuted patent infringers. This situation helped propel RCA to the forefront of radio manufacturers in the 1920s due to the higher efficiency of the superhet circuit—a situation which lasted until the patents expired in the early 1930s, at which time a flood of low-cost superheterodyne receivers hit the market. Early (RCA-patent-era) superhets were often used with the relatively expensive moving coil speakers, which offer a quality of sound unavailable from moving iron speakers.

Most post-1932 commercial radios were superhets, and this technology is still in widespread use in radio receivers today, implemented with transistors or integrated circuits.

The advantages of superhets are:

- Excellent sensitivity and selectivity
- Ease of designing the set for multiple-band operation, enabling reception of foreign broadcasts ("Shortwave")
- High stability
- Well controlled bandwidth
- Well shaped RF passband avoids the uncontrolled tone variations of TRF sets, and gives good selectivity

The disadvantages before about 1932 were:

- High patent-licensing costs.
- Need for specialized test equipment to perform conversion-stage filter alignments.

In general the technical and manufacturing advantages of the superhet ensured that the TRF set became quickly obsolete once the patent restrictions on superhets were eliminated.

=== Farm radios ===
Prior to the Rural Electrification Act of 1936, the vast majority of rural farms in America did not have electricity. Many rural areas of the Midwest and South did not receive commercial power until the 1960s. Until that point, special radios were made to run on DC power. The earliest so-called "farm radios" used the "A", "B", and "C" batteries typical of 1920s radio sets; these farm radios were identical to those used in cities. Somewhat later, farm radios were made to be run on 6 V from a car or tractor battery, using an electromechanical vibrator to create a pulsating DC current that could be stepped up through a transformer to create the high voltage needed for the plates of the tubes—exactly as contemporary car radios did. Other farm radios were designed to run on 32 V DC, from a bank of lead-acid storage batteries charged from a gas powered generator or a wind-charger. The 32-volt system could also power other specially made appliances as well as electric lights around the farm. Other farm radios, especially from the late 1930s to the 1950s, reverted to using a large "A-B" dry cell that provided both 90 V for the tube plates and 1.5 V for the tube filaments, as did most tube-based portable radios of that era.

=== Foxhole radios ===
World War 2 created widespread urgent need for radio communication, and foxhole sets were built by people without access to traditional radio parts. A foxhole radio is a simple crystal set radio receiver cobbled together from whatever parts one could make (which were very few indeed) or scrounged from junked equipment. Such a set typically used salvaged domestic wiring for an antenna, a double-edged safety-razor blade and pencil lead (or bent safety-pin) for a detector, and a tin can, magnet and some wire for an earpiece. Razor blades of the era were chemically coated ("blued") and this coating could function as a diode, in the same way that a galena cat's whisker detector operates.

=== Wooden consoles ===
The console radio was the center piece of household entertainment in the era of radio. They were big and expensive, beautifully made wood cabinets, often costing hundreds of dollars in the late Depression era 1930s and were often coupled with a phonograph. These tended to be a major acquisition for a middle-class family, and these large console radios were usually placed in the living room. Most very early console radios were tall and narrow, but as the years went on they got shorter and wider in accordance with the Art Deco design precepts which had become popular.

Consumer console radios were made by RCA, Philco, General Electric, Montgomery Ward (under the Airline brand name), Sears (under the Silvertone brand name), Westinghouse, Zenith and others. Brands such as Zenith and Stromberg-Carlson made a few high-end high-priced models ("Stratosphere"), but mainly they produced moderately priced radios. Motorola had radios in many cars by 1940 using the previously mentioned vibrator power supply necessary for tube operation.

Some premium makers such as E. H. Scott and Silver-Marshall started around $500–$800 range in the 1930s and 1940s.

=== Table-top wood-cased radios ===
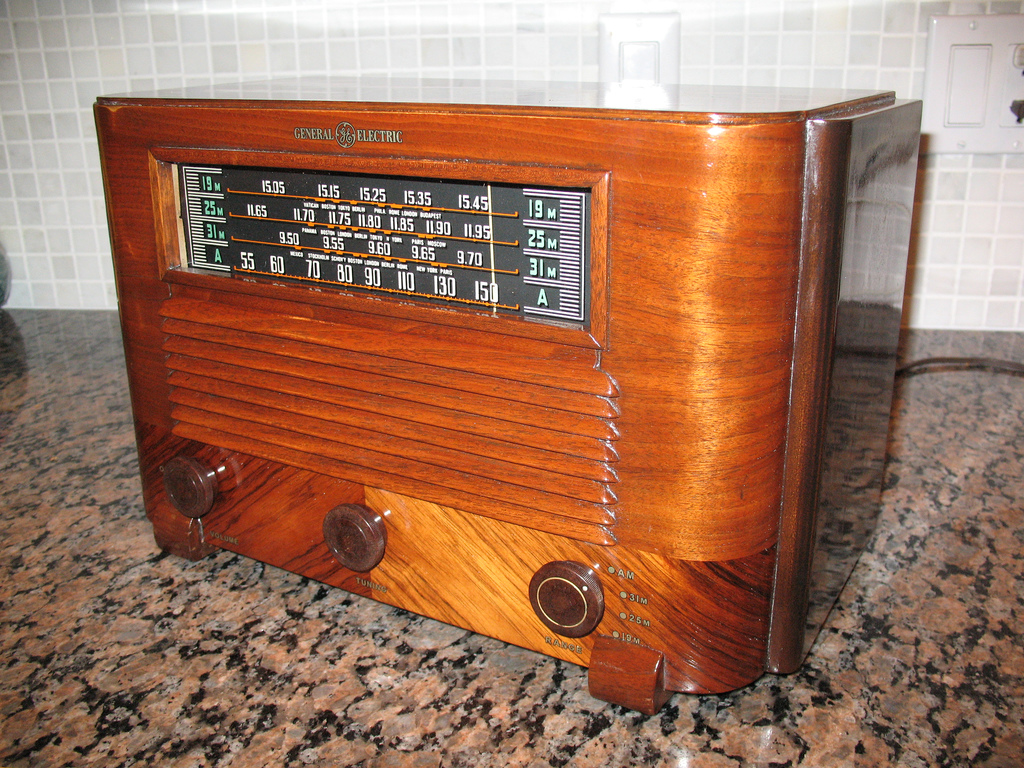
Wood tabletop set from 1941

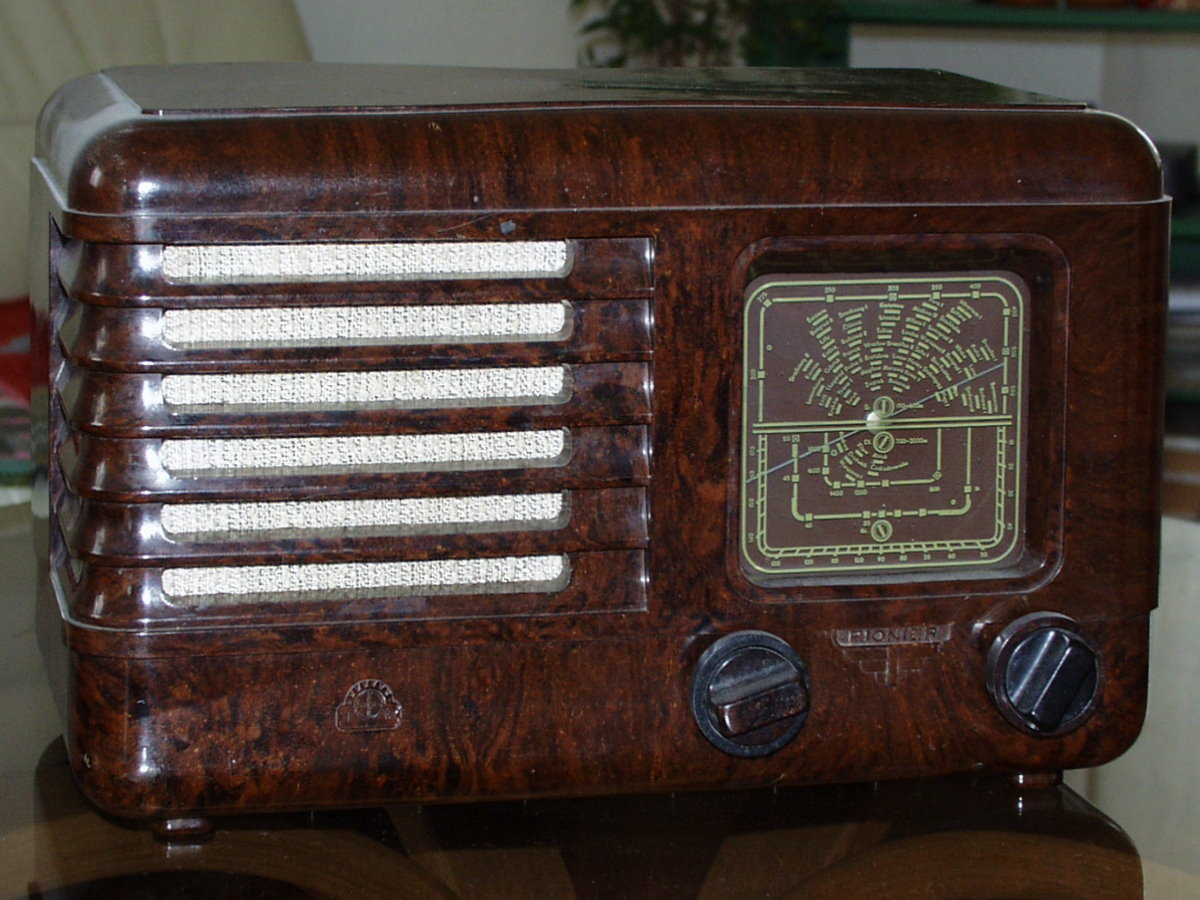
Wood-look Bakelite Tabletop set from the late '40s

Table top radios came in many forms:

- "Cathedral style", an upright rectangular box with a rounded top
- "Tombstone style" are rectangular boxes that are tall and narrow like a tombstone
- "Table top" are rectangular, with width being the larger dimension. Table top radios are usually placed in the kitchen, living room, or bedroom, and sometimes used out on the porch.

=== Bakelite ===
The availability of the first mass-produced plastic Bakelite allowed designers much more creativity in cabinet styling, and significantly reduced costs. However, Bakelite is a very brittle plastic, and dropping a radio could easily crack or break the case. Bakelite is a brown-black mouldable thermosetting plastic, and is still used in some products today.

In the 1930s some radios were manufactured using Catalin, which is the phenolic resin component of bakelite, with no organic filler added, but nearly all historic bakelite radios are the standard black-brown bakelite color. Bakelite as used for radio cabinets was traditionally brown, and this color came from the ground walnut-shell flour added to the thermosetting phenolic resin as an extender and strengthening agent.

=== Plastic era ===
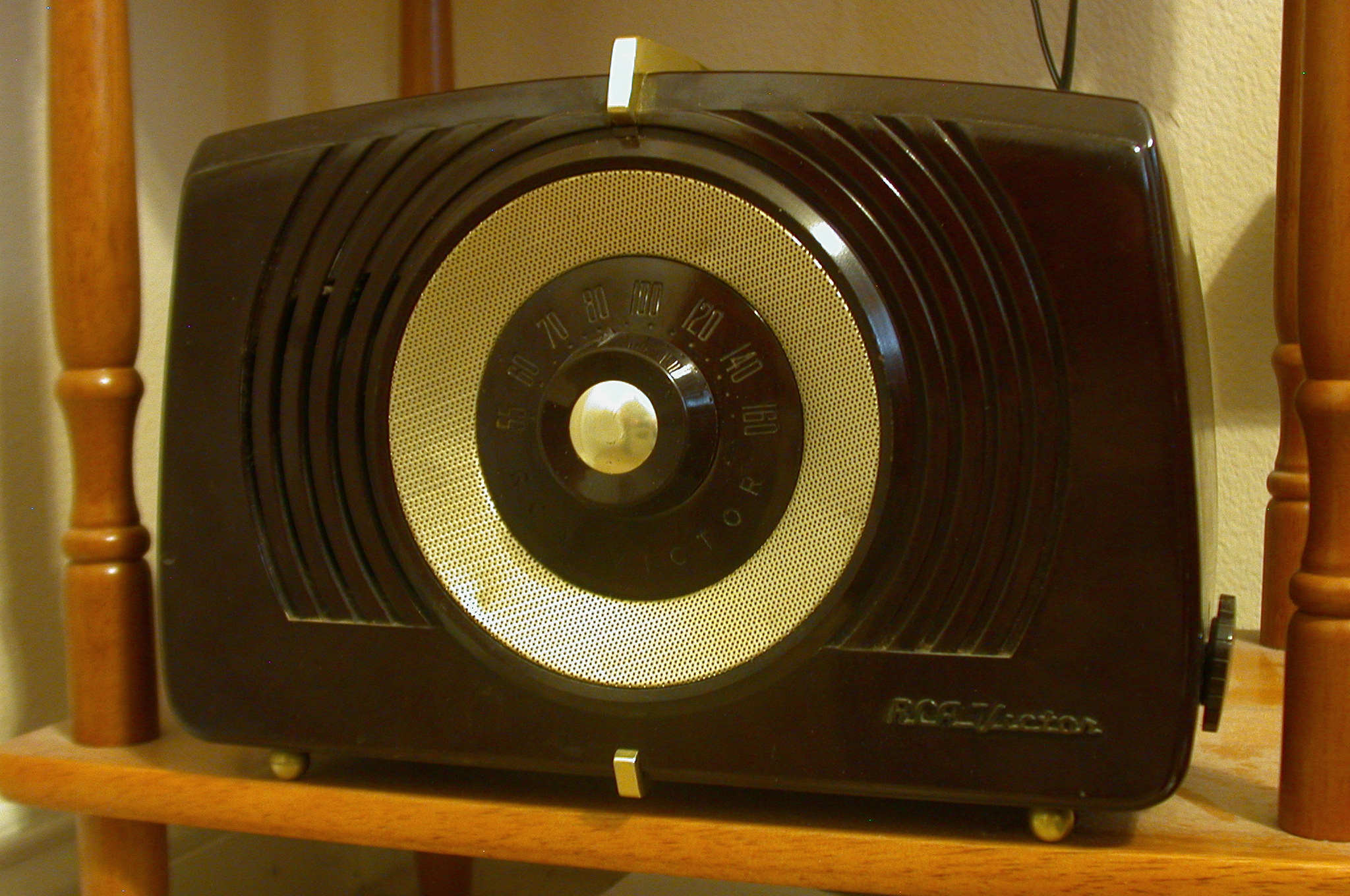
Early '50s AC/DC tabletop radio

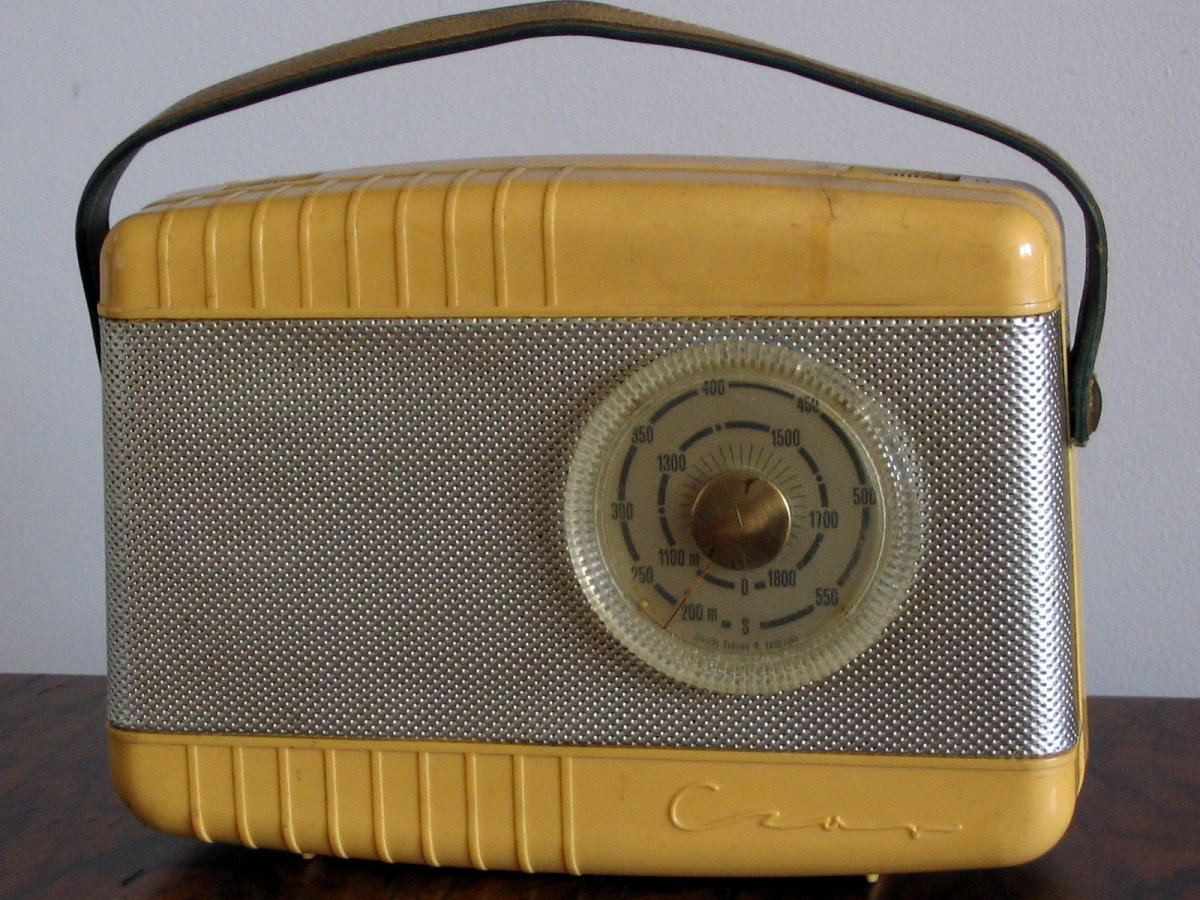
'50s transistor radio

The affordability of more modern light coloured thermoplastics in the 1950s made brighter designs practical. Some of these thermoplastics are slightly translucent.

=== Early transistor radios ===
The invention of the transistor made it possible to produce very small portable radios that did not need a warm-up time, and ran on much smaller batteries. They were convenient, though the prices were initially high and the sound quality of early models was not nearly as good as tube radios. Later models equalled or surpassed tube models in audio quality. Transistors also made it possible to manufacture portable FM radios, which was impractical using tubes.

Transistor radios were available in many sizes from console to table-top to matchbox. Transistors are still used in today's radios, though the integrated circuit containing a large number of transistors has surpassed the use of singly packed transistors for the majority of radio circuitry.

Transistor radios appeared on the market in 1954, but at a high price. By the 1960s, reduced prices and an increase in desire for portability made them very popular.

There was something of a marketing war over the number of transistors sets contained, with many models named after this number. Some sets even had non-functional reject transistors soldered to the circuit board, doing absolutely nothing, so the sales pitch could advertise a higher number of transistors.

Vacuum tube radios and early transistor radios were hand assembled. Today radios are designed with the assistance of computers and manufactured with much greater use of machinery.

Today's radios are usually uneconomical to repair because mass production and technological improvements in numerous areas have made them so inexpensive to buy, while the cost of human labor and workshop overheads have increased greatly in comparison.

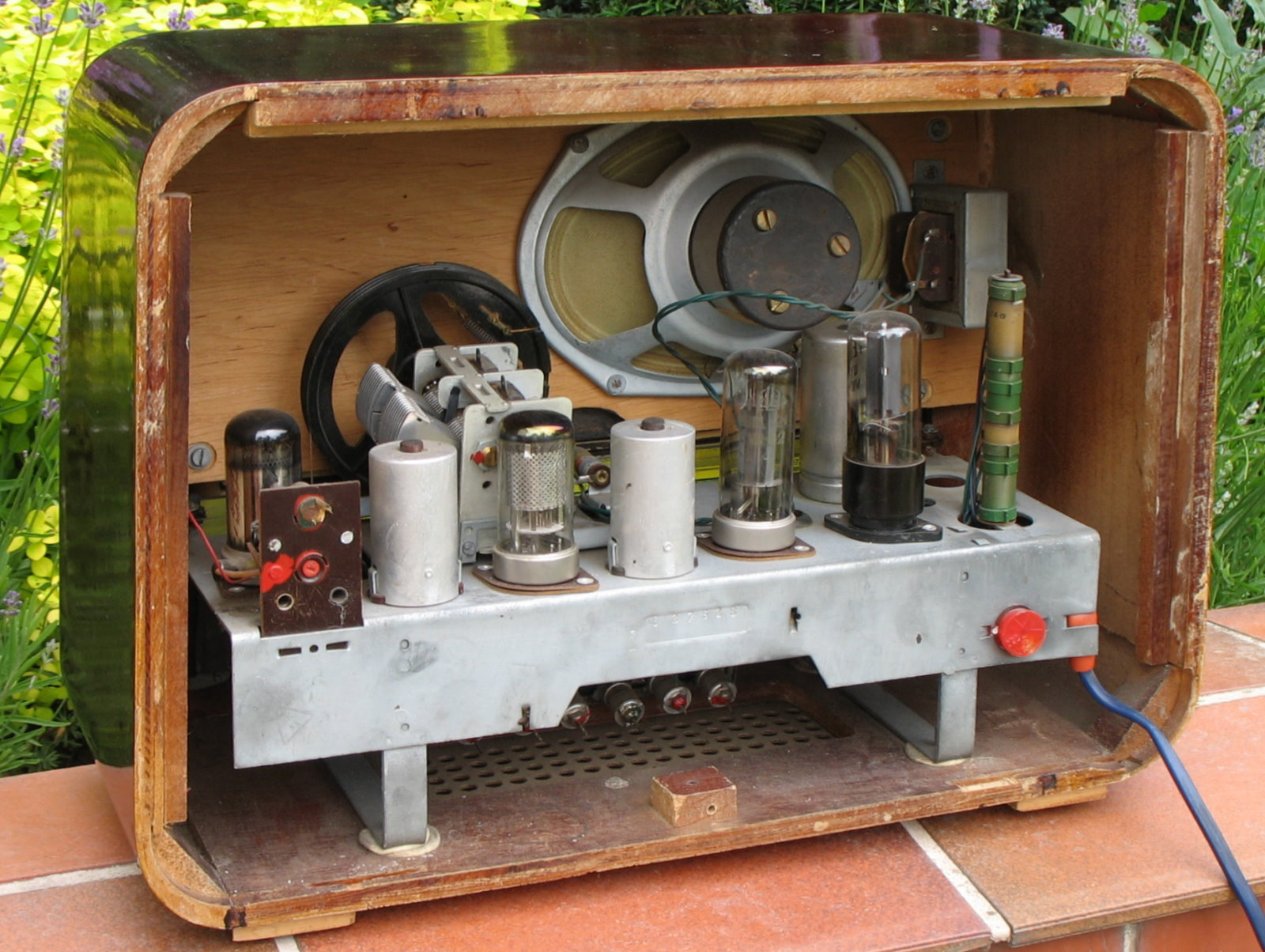
Typical insides of an antique radio, showing the vacuum tubes.

=== Car radios ===
The earliest car radios appeared not long after commercial radio broadcasts commenced, but were experimental only. They were expensive, required a large aerial, reception was inconsistent, and they required adjustment in use, which was not very practical.

By the early 1930s most car radios, no longer experimental, were superheterodynes and used a vibrator power supply to step up the low voltage to high voltage ("B+" voltage of anywhere from 90 to 250 V) for the vacuum tubes. Vibrators are relatively unreliable as electromechanical components of limited life, buzz audibly, and produce radio interference. A few radios used a bulkier and more expensive motor-generator or motor-alternator set called a "dynamotor" that spun a high-voltage generator or alternator using a 6- or 12-volt DC motor. Filaments were powered using 6- and later 12-volt DC power from the vehicle's electrical system directly.

With the introduction of transistors, the earlier ones suitable for audio frequencies only, car radios were valve sets with a transistor output stage; makers promoted them as transistor sets. Some historic car radios badged as transistorised are in reality of this type. All-transistor sets eventually replaced sets with vacuum tube after transistor technology improved and prices fell significantly.

Chrysler and Philco announced an all-transistor car radio in the April 28, 1955, edition of the Wall Street Journal. This Philco car radio model was the first tubeless auto set in history to be developed and produced. It was a $150 option for 1956 Chrysler and Imperial cars and hit the showroom floor on October 21, 1955.

== Warm-up time ==
Most valve sets needed a few seconds for the valves to heat up, though there were exceptions. Warm-up times changed as valves went through several generations of design.

- Bright emitter valves universal in the early 1920s came on in a small fraction of a second, effectively instantly.
- Direct dull emitters typical of the late '20s and 1930s came on in around a second. This type of valve continued to be popular in battery sets for several decades more.
- Indirect emitters used in more or less all mains valve radios from the late 1930s onward were slow to reach emission temperature, with wait times routinely exceeding 10 seconds.
- The last generation of valves was nuvistors. These tiny devices reached emission temperature fairly quickly.

== Use of vintage radios ==
=== Line-operated commercial sets ===
Using vintage radios generally requires inspection and repair or refurbishment before they can be safely operated. In most cases, at least the power supply section of line-operated radios must be refurbished to prevent damage to other components, but it can be assumed that most of the vintage capacitors are electrically "leaky" and that the electrolytic capacitors in the power supply have either lost capacity (leading to excess "hum") or shorted (potentially causing a damaging or fire-inducing short-circuit). In their original state, they complied only with the limited safety standards of the time, and almost none used fuses.

AC-operated radios using power transformers require repair and refurbishment of the power supply section before operation, as any failures are likely to stress or damage the power transformer, necessitating a costly repair.

AC/DC sets not using a power transformer may be either "curtain burners" using a resistance cord to drop the line voltage, or warm/hot chassis radios using a series-string filament circuit where the voltages add up to the line voltage. They were named "AC/DC" because they operated on either AC or DC line voltage, which was not possible with a transformer-based set.

"Curtain burner" sets were common in the early 1930s "midget" sets. The name is an indication of the problem—the line cord contained resistors to drop the voltage and dissipated substantial power in the cord itself. When operating properly and the line cord was stretched to full length, the cord got "warm" and was safe enough (until the heat made the rubber insulation crack). When the cord was coiled up or otherwise insulated (like from a curtain resting on it) it could get very hot, and frequently caused a fire. Resistance line cords are no longer available and the vintage cords are no longer serviceable, so the radio must be partially redesigned with either a dropping capacitor, dropping resistor, or some other workaround for safe operation.

AC/DC sets lacking resistance line cords instead used tube filaments in series that added up to the line voltage, effectively moving the resistance into the radio. They use conventional line cords. These are the most common vintage radio in the US after about 1940 or so, as they were very inexpensive to manufacture. They are much less common in areas with 240-volt mains power, as there were few common tubes built to operate at the high voltages required. BC (medium wave/"AM") only radios like the "All American 5" design, and later AM/FM radios with more tubes, and even televisions were built using the same idea, because of the simplicity and low cost possible.

Either type of AC/DC radio can present the "hot" line of the line voltage on the chassis of the radio ("hot chassis") or isolated from the chassis by a single capacitor ("warm chassis"). This presents a safety problem, as depending on the direction of the non-polarized plug, the hot side of the line voltage can be connected directly to all the metal parts of the radio any time it is plugged in, regardless of whether it is powered on or not. Proper repair or refurbishment requires an isolation transformer to remove the live connection, and care should be taken to never touch any metal part of the radio (chassis mounting screws, bare control shafts, etc.) when the radio is plugged in. Many radios with a hot chassis use interlocks on the back to ensure that the line is disconnected before the rear can be accessed for tube replacement.

Later transistor-based AC table radios typically used power transformers and operate safely, but with likely hum from failed electrolytic capacitors in the power supply, and likely low volume from other failed electrolytic coupling capacitors. There were a few early transistor table radios using "hot chassis" principles, but these are very rare.

=== Early battery-operated sets ===
The minority of all-in-one commercial ac mains sets that appeared in the 1930s were entirely self-sufficient, containing built in antennas, speakers, and power supplies. Such sets should be checked for the possible existence of live metalwork accessible to the user, and a general safety check is advisable. Many will need a repair of some sort.

However, many radios from before the Great Depression contain only the receiver circuitry. The rest of the unit was generally not self contained and the user would need to construct a receiving antenna and often provide dry battery power.

There are several issues with them:

- Failed components are to be expected, and these must be located and then repaired.
- Repair of parts is practical, but not trivial.
- Some of these sets never worked very well and may benefit from some skilled debugging.
- 3 power supplies are needed to replace the originally used A, B and C batteries (unless self-biasing is used) (or DC mains).
- A little detective work is needed to find out what power supply unit voltages are needed.
- A long wire antenna will need to be erected.
- Fitting a local ground (earth) is frequently necessary, and quite easy.
- A high impedance speaker (or transformer) is needed.
- Some means to keep fingers away from the exposed live connections on the rear is wise, and often legally obligatory.
- With 1920s and earlier sets using bright emitter valves, the end user should understand the use of the filament rheostats to avoid rapid valve failure.
- The user should realise that permitting historic reaction sets to oscillate causes them to transmit interference, which is illegal.
- Negative supply DC mains sets should have their ground capacitor bypassed to convert them from live chassis to earthed chassis.

== Sound quality ==
The sound quality of antique radios depends on the technologies used in the set. The type of speaker is the main differentiator, with mains or battery also making a significant difference.

All valve sets produce 2nd harmonic distortion, which is fairly euphonic. Some also produce significant 3rd harmonic distortion, which is less pleasant to the ear.

Discussion is often heard about the distortion of triode versus pentode valves, and single ended versus push pull, which affect the types of distortion produced, but these issues seem to be secondary in practice to the ones discussed in this article, and are already well covered in other articles.

=== Loudspeaker types ===
==== Moving iron speaker ====
Homemade pre-war sets usually used some form of moving iron speaker, usually horn or cone loaded, and occasionally disc loaded. The sound quality of such radios is generally unimportant, since almost any defect in the audio signal will be masked by the butchery visited upon it by the loudspeaker. The question of sound quality is heavily dominated by the speaker in these cases. Moving iron speakers suffer the following defects:

- Gross non-linearity
- Heavy intermodulation distortion
- Little bass response
- Poor treble response
- Strong undamped resonance in the middle of the audio spectrum
- Noisy chattering when presented with a loud bass note
- Tendency of the moving iron to stick to the pole piece, resulting in a 'whack' sound followed by very little sound output.
- Gross impedance mismatch
- Need for adjustment
- Prone to demagnetisation
- Horn speakers were strongly directional
- Cone speakers were readily damaged

The sound of moving iron speakers has a strong unmistakable character.

They were far from faithful in their reproduction of audio, and their technical specifications were poorly controlled. An example of this is their electrical impedance, which varied across the audio spectrum by a ratio of more than 100:1.

It is not unusual for an electronics student, on hearing some of the specs of these devices, to conclude that they could not have been capable of reproducing speech. Yet they do, and with a sound that can not be mistaken for anything else.

==== Inductor dynamic speaker ====
These enjoyed brief success but were quickly eclipsed by moving coil speakers. The Inductor Dynamic Speaker solved the worst problems of earlier moving iron types, and provided a relatively pleasant listening experience. The main defect of ID speakers was poor treble response, giving them a characteristic dull drone.

==== Moving coil speaker ====
These speakers were mostly of sufficient quality that the radio's characteristics become significant. Transformer coupled sets suffered loss of bass & reduced treble, grid leak sets where rf and af were amplified by the same valve gave some nonlinearity, and output stages always provided a little more non-linearity. However the quality of a moving coil equipped set can be pleasant, and mistakable for a modern portable radio.

== See also ==
- Vintage amateur radio
- History of radio
- List of radios – List of specific models of radios
