= Bob Pridden =

English sound engineer

- Born: 1946 (age 79–80); Ickenham, London, England
- Occupations: Audio engineer; roadie; record producer
- Years active: 1966 – 2016

Bob Pridden (born 1946) is an English audio engineer, roadie, and record producer, best known for his long-standing position as principal sound engineer for the rock band the Who. He has also worked with a number of other rock musicians and with individual members of the Who on solo projects.

== Biography ==
Bob Pridden was born in 1946 in Ickenham, England, and married Lady Maria Noel.

Pridden grew up only a few miles from the West London neighbourhoods in which Pete Townshend, Roger Daltrey and John Entwistle lived. His first job was working with the John Barry Seven. He became a roadie for the Who after talking to John Wolff, then the bands main roadie and driver. He made his debut as roadie at a gig in Streatham, London on 15 December 1966, and was promoted to sound engineer in 1969. He has provided the stage mix for every Who concert ever since. According to Pete Townshend in 2007, Pridden and the rest of the band "all converged just before the Monterey Pop Festival in 1967. So we have worked together for 40 years.", although he missed the first two trips to the US, finally going for the Herman Hermits tour which started in July 1967.

== Career ==
Pridden is commonly credited for having created on-stage "wedge" monitors in the late '60s; previously, onstage performers had no way to hear themselves singing, so during the 1968 American tour he began placing a speaker cabinet on its side in front of the band. However, the band preferred stage side monitors for a long period, so he helped to develop these with the WEM company, even loaning the bands stage PA to other acts at both the 1969 and 1970 Isle of Wight Festival. Pridden then requested a slanted speaker cabinet that sat on the floor and tilted upwards toward the performer. Since that time, onstage "wedge" monitors have become standard equipment at virtually every live performance of any scale worldwide.

Pridden has worked both on stage and in the studio with many other of classic rock's major names, as well as with younger acts. He is credited on several of the Who's albums including Live at Leeds, and produced the 1973 Eric Clapton's Rainbow Concert. Pridden served as on stage sound engineer from the Who's 1969 tour onwards, and also for David Bowie and Paul McCartney at Live Aid in 1985.

Many of the Who's songs, especially songs from Who's Next and Quadrophenia, need to have pre-recorded tapes when performed live. Pridden once said, "I don't trust machines. Machines go wrong. My heart pounds before I press the button hoping for it to work." Daltrey also said, "Bob has had the tape recorder thrown at him many a time - especially when the thing'd break!."

Pridden is unusual in the music business for having attained recognition for his technical rather than musical input, and is rare in the fact that his name is known when most roadies and engineers are not. Although over sixty years old, he continued to tour with the Who, mixing many of their later live CD/DVD releases, and in 2006 he co-produced Roger Daltrey's vocals on the Who's album Endless Wire. Pridden eventually retired from his post as The Who's onstage sound man in 2016.

== See also ==
- The Who's influence on sound
- Marshall Amplification
