= Military grade =

Marketing buzzword

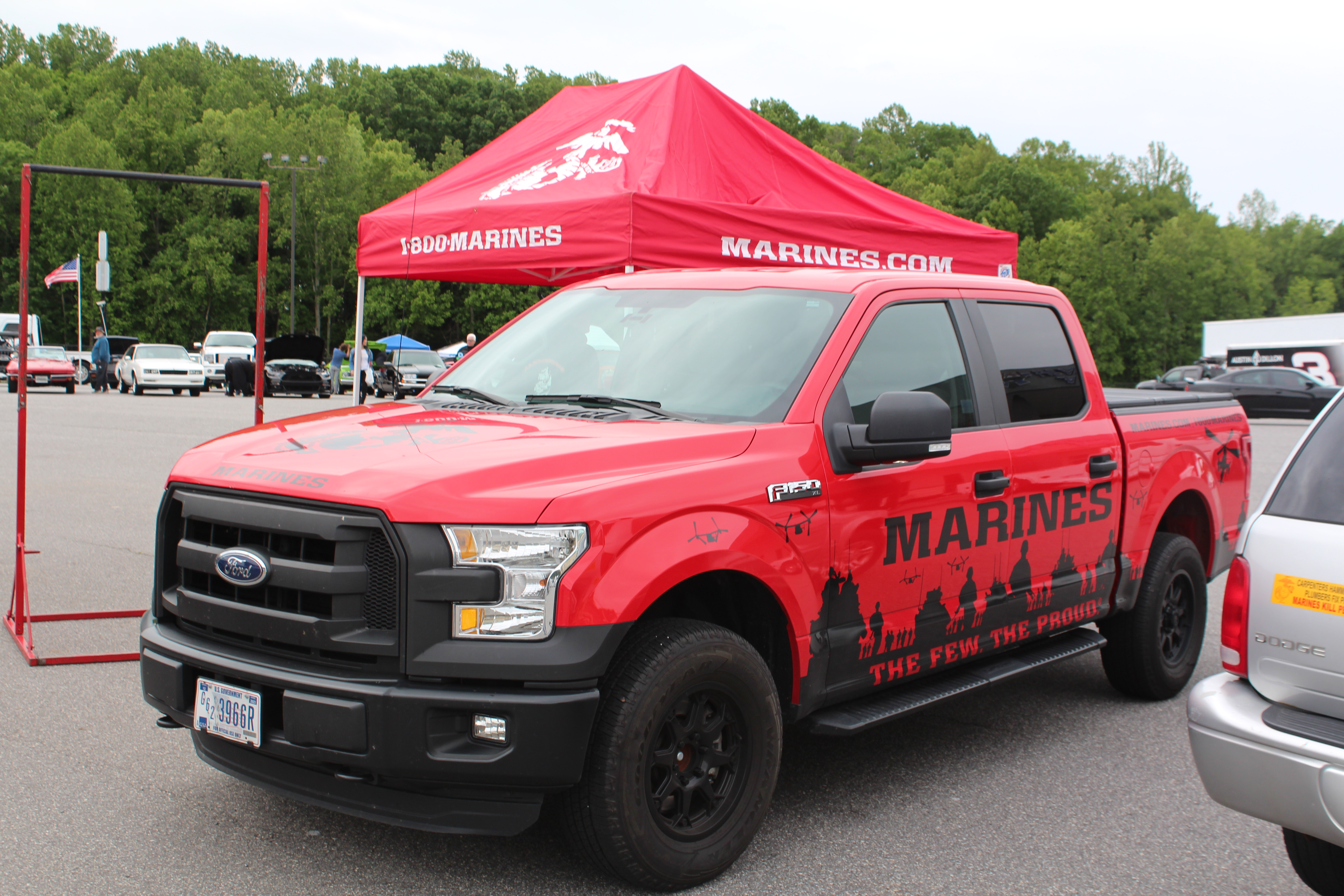
A thirteenth generation Ford F-150 used by the United States Marine Corps to promote recruitment. This generation of Ford F-Series was infamously marketed as using "military-grade aluminum", despite no such thing existing.

"Military grade" (alternatively "military-grade" or "mil-spec") is a buzzword commonly used in marketing and advertising for consumer goods. It is generally used to describe an item or product that satisfies a United States Military Standard, usually MIL-STD-810 for stress testing; however, it is often used as a marketing ploy to describe a product that satisfies any military standard regardless of what it is (if a standard is satisfied at all to begin with), or one that simply uses materials that are also used in military technology ranging from Kevlar to aluminum.

In marketing, "military grade" is meant to symbolize and evoke higher-than-usual levels of toughness, durability, efficiency, and quality, as well as the implication that the product was tested and "approved" by some (non-existent) overseeing body or is regularly used and trusted by militaries—even if none of those are true. Products often marketed as "military grade" include phone cases, flashlights, electronics, eyewear, and clothing.

Use of the term in marketing has been criticized by military personnel and veterans, who note that items that are indeed "military grade"—as in actually issued by militaries to their personnel—are often procured for cost-effectiveness and may not always be of the highest quality and reliability. However, a product's use of the term should not be inferred as a sign it is unreliable, as some items using the term may in fact be using it genuinely (e.g. are in fact used by the military, or are identical to military equivalents).

== Notable uses ==
- In 2015, advertisements for the thirteenth generation Ford F-Series pickup truck notably described it as using "high strength, military-grade aluminum alloy", despite no such thing actually existing. The only real similarities between the aluminum used in the F-Series and some military vehicles are their composition and heat-treating.
- In 2023, a dispute arose between Leonardo Helicopters and Lockheed Martin relating to marketing terminology used in the British Ministry of Defence's New Medium Helicopter program. Lockheed had claimed other competitors in the program, including the AgustaWestland AW149 built by Leonardo, were not designed or suitable for military use (i.e. military grade), whereas their Sikorsky UH-60 Black Hawk was.

== See also ==
- Commercial off-the-shelf
- Militaria
- So-called "Corinthian leather"
