= Marshall JTM45 =

Guitar amplifier

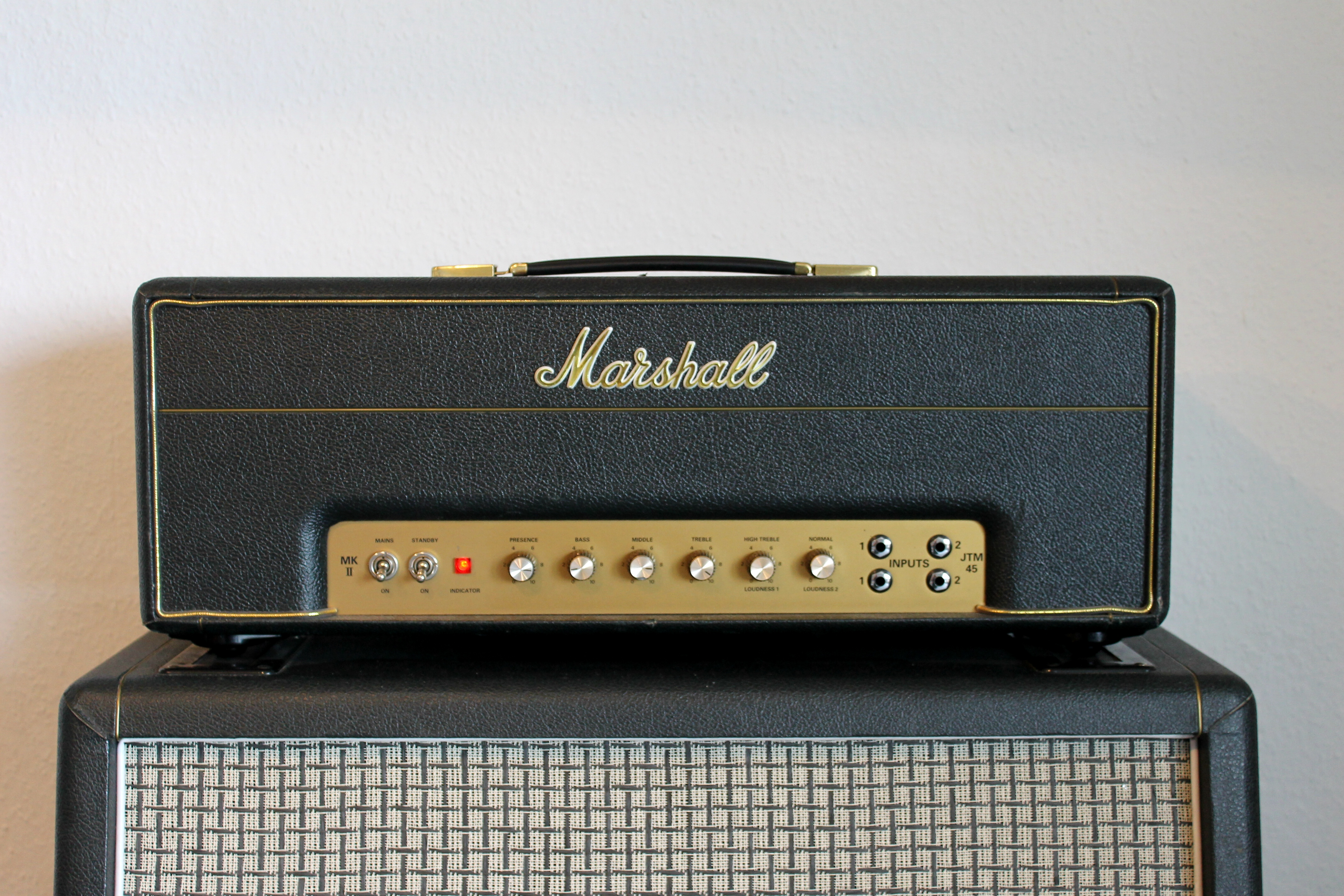
Marshall JTM45 MK II Reissue

The Marshall JTM45 amplifier is the first guitar amplifier produced by the British company Marshall. It was initially produced in 1963, and has been ranked among the most desirable of the company's amplifiers.

Notable musicians who have used this amplifier include David Gilmour, the Rolling Stones, and Jimi Hendrix, among others.

== History and development ==
Prototyping of the JTM45 began in 1962, after London musical instrument retailer Jim Marshall decided to create a new amplifier in response to local guitarists' desire for an alternative to imported American Fender amplifiers. Marshall sought the advice of his shop repairman Ken Bran, who recommended electronics "whiz kid" Dudley Craven as the chief circuit designer. Marshall then arranged for Pete Townshend and Ritchie Blackmore demo prototypes to be constructed by Bran and Craven, settling on the sixth prototype as the production model.

This model was dubbed the "JTM45" – for Jim and his son Terry Marshall, and 45 for the RMS-rated wattage – the amplifier mimicked the circuitry of the Fender Bassman but had an all-aluminum chassis, and a 12AX7 valve as the first in the chain (while the Bassman had a 12AY7). In addition, it featured Celestion speakers with a closed cabinet (rather than open-backed Jensen speakers), and a modified negative feedback circuit, which affected the harmonics produced by the amplifier.

As Bran later said, "The JTM also had different harmonic content, and this was due to the large amount of feedback that Dudley Craven had given it." Early versions used 6L6 or US 5881 valves (a version of the 6L6) in the output stage; later models used KT66 (from 1964), EL34 (from 1966), or KT88 (from 1967; in the 200W Major), and ECC83 (12AX7) valves in the pre-amplification stage. The amplifier was also available in the bass format (although this model lacked a "bright" capacitor) and an additional PA version (which lacked a "mixer" capacitor). Because of its power, Marshall decided early on to build it as a "head," with a separate 4×12" cabinet with Celestion speakers.

The first-ever use of this JTM 45 model in a live performance was in September 1963, when the amplifier was tested at the Ealing Club, a short distance from the original Marshall shops. By the mid-1960s, the JTM45 had become so popular that it began to supplant the ubiquitous Vox amplifiers, including the Vox AC50, even though the Vox amplifier was equal in power to the Marshall amplifier.

In late 1965, Marshall introduced its now standard script lettering, in white. By early 1966 it began calling the amplifiers "JTM 50". Some 100 early models had red lettering, and are especially sought after by collectors. Other cosmetic changes included a gradual change to different knobs. The JTM 45 became the basis for many subsequent Marshall amplifiers, most notably the Marshall 1962 combo (later referred to as the "Bluesbreaker" due to its use by Eric Clapton with John Mayall's Bluesbreakers). Production of this model ceased in 1966, but it was reissued in 1989, albeit with a modern printed circuit board and 6L6 output valves. In 2014 Marshall reissued a "handwired" 30 W amplifier based on the JTM45, the 2245THW, whose circuitry is identical to the 1962 combo circuit; it is a "fine high-end piece" according to Vintage Guitar, listed at $4,800.

== Name, numbering ==
The first JTM45s did not have the standard Marshall numbers that later amplifiers had; models that derived from the JTM 45 did not receive serial numbers until 1964–1965 when backplates began to be applied. However, at random some of the early amplifiers had serial numbers stamped into the chassis on their reverse side.

Model number	Watts	Dates	Features	Notes
JTM45	35–45	1963–1964	2 channels, 4 inputs	Also available in bass and PA versions
1963	50	1965–1966	4 channels, 8 inputs	PA version; "JTM50 MK III"
1985	45	1965–1966	2 channels, 4 inputs	PA version of JTM50 MK II
1986	45	1965–1966	High treble and normal channels	Bass version of JTM50 MK II
1987	45	1965–1966	High treble and normal channels	Lead version of JTM50 MK II; also with tremolo as Model T1987
1989	45	1965–1966	For electronic organs	Also with tremolo as Model T1989
JTM 45 (2245)	30	1989–	2 channels, 4 inputs	Reissue of original JTM45 (1987)
2245THW	30	2014–	Handwired head, circuitry identical with Bluesbreaker	

== Sound ==
For all of its differences when compared with the Bassman, the sound of the JTM45 is still described as "like a tweed Fender", and is favored for blues and rock rather than for hard rock and metal. The JTM 45 delivers a smooth Marshall sound with a warm bass response due to the EL34/KT66 valves.

== Notable users ==
- Eric Clapton
- Arthur Brown
- John Entwistle
- David Gilmour
- Eddy Grant
- Peter Green
- Jeff Beck
- Jimi Hendrix
- Gary Moore (reissue)
- Pete Townshend
- Angus Young (live, Young has a JTM45 in an isolation box under the stage)
- The Rolling Stones
