= Crest Audio =

American audio equipment manufacturer

Crest Audio, Inc. is an American company that produces professional sound equipment, including audio mixers, power amplifiers, and loudspeakers. Crest Audio was founded in the late 1970s by Jean-Pierre Prideaux in California. Dallas Music Industries (DMI) acquired Crest Audio in the 1980s and subsequently, Crest Audio was acquired by Peavey Electronics in 1999, and has since been based in Meridian, Mississippi. The company has an international network of distributors.

== History ==
The company was founded in the late 1970s by Jean-Pierre (John) Prideaux to build power amplifiers for the tour sound industry. The first amplifier, the P3500, delivered 475 watts-per-channel in a chassis that occupied a two-rack space at a time when competitors were offering 400 watts in a four-rack space. In 1983, the 4001 amplifier was the first to provide two-ohms in a three-rack space chassis. Four years later the 8001 power amplifier became an industry standard concert sound amplifier. It was superseded by the 8002 model in 1998.

In 1989, Crest audio diversified into mixing consoles with its Gamble EX series. Two years later the company introduced NexSys, a computer-based network amplifier control system that became the basis of a range that addresses every aspect of installation configuration and control.
