= Jim Marshall (businessman) =

English businessman and pioneer of guitar amplification (1923–2012)

Jim Marshall OBE
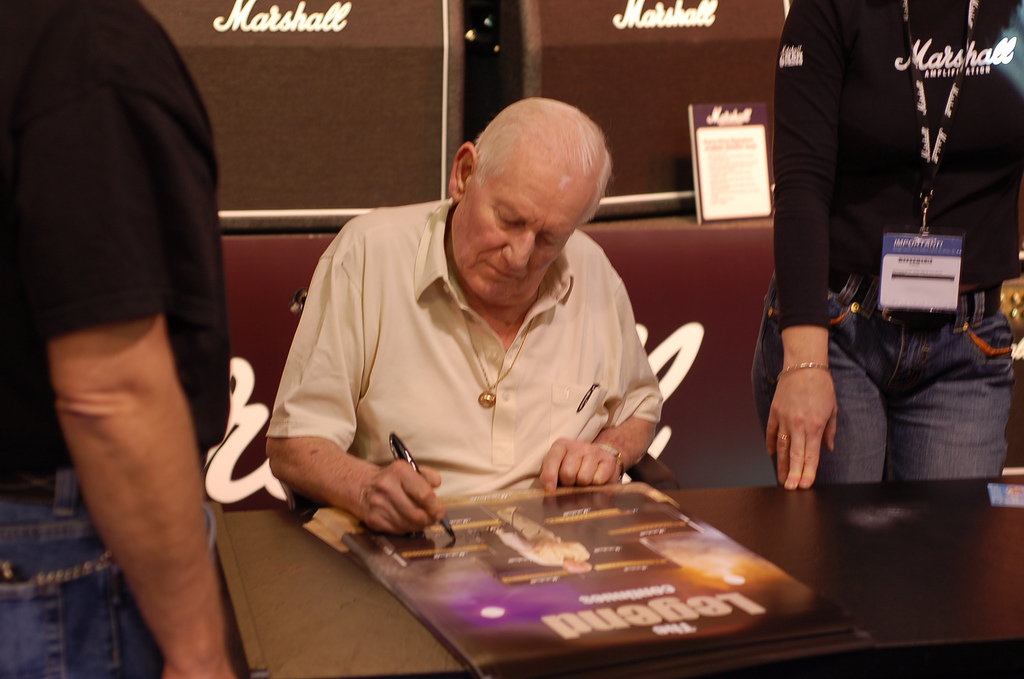
- Marshall in 2007
- Born: James Charles Marshall; 29 July 1923; London, England
- Died: 5 April 2012 (aged 88); Milton Keynes, Buckinghamshire, England
- Other names: The Father of Loud; The Lord of Loud
- Occupation: Businessman
- Employer: Marshall Amplification
- Known for: Pioneering guitar amplification

James Charles Marshall OBE (29 July 1923 – 5 April 2012) known as The Father of Loud or The Lord of Loud, was an English businessman and pioneer of guitar amplification. His company, Marshall Amplification, founded in 1962, has created equipment that is used by some of the biggest names in rock music, producing amplifiers with an iconic status.

Described by The Times as a "charismatic amplifier innovator and music entrepreneur", Marshall was awarded an OBE at Buckingham Palace in 2003 for "services to the music industry and to charity". In 2009, he was given the Freedom of the Borough of Milton Keynes for his work in the community.

== Early life ==
Marshall was born in Acton, West London, in 1923, into a family which included boxers and music hall artists. As a child he was diagnosed with tubercular bones, and spent many years in hospital. His formal education suffered as a consequence. During the Second World War he was exempt from military service due to his poor health. He became a singer, and then, due to the shortage of available civilian musicians, doubled as a drummer. In his day job as electrical engineer he built a portable amplification system so his light, crooning vocals could be heard over his drums. "I was making 10 shillings (£0.50) a night and because it was wartime, we didn't have any petrol for cars, so I would ride my bicycle with a trailer behind it to carry my drum kit and the PA cabinets which I had made! I then left the orchestra to be with a 7 piece band and in 1942 the drummer leader was called into the forces and I took over on drums."

To become more proficient on the drums and to better emulate his idol, Gene Krupa, from 1946 to 1948 Marshall took weekly lessons from Max Abrams. In the 1950s, Marshall became part of the English music scene and started teaching other drummers, including Mitch Mitchell (The Jimi Hendrix Experience), Micky Waller (Little Richard) and Mick Underwood (The Outlaws with Ritchie Blackmore). Marshall commented, "I used to teach about 65 pupils a week and what with playing as well, I was earning in the early 1950s somewhere in the region of £5,000 a year (eqv. 2012 to £108,000), which was how I first saved money to go into business."

== Marshall Amplification ==
From 1960, Marshall owned a moderately successful music store in Hanwell, West London, selling drums and then branching out into guitars. His many guitar playing customers (including Ritchie Blackmore, Big Jim Sullivan and Pete Townshend) spoke of the need for a particular kind of amplifier, with Townshend wanting something "bigger and louder", and Marshall saw the opportunity, founding Marshall Amplification in 1962, with Dudley Craven and Ken Bran as assistants. Using a Fender Bassman as a starting point, it took them six attempts to create an amp (the Marshall JTM 45) that Jim Marshall was happy with and it was Pete Townshend of The Who who dubbed it "the Marshall sound" that revolutionised music.

External videos
- Oral History, Jim Marshall explains a key to his success. interview date 21 July 2002, NAMM (National Association of Music Merchants) Oral History Library

As the company grew, Marshall expanded his products, and unveiled the Master Volume Marshall amps and the classic Marshall JCM800 split channel amps introduced in 1981. Soon after he started production, musicians including Jimi Hendrix, Eric Clapton and Jimmy Page were using his equipment. The "Marshall stack", a wall of black, vinyl-clad cabinets, one atop the other, was seen as the physical embodiment of rock's power, majesty and excess. A Marshall features in the famous amp scene in the 1984 mockumentary, This Is Spinal Tap, with guitarist Nigel Tufnel claiming his Marshall's volume knob went "one louder" to a unique setting of 11 on the dial. In response, Marshall set about producing models that could be cranked up to 20.

== Awards and honours ==
In 1984 Marshall was awarded the Queen's Award for Export, an honour bestowed by Queen Elizabeth II of the United Kingdom in recognition of Marshall Amplification's outstanding export achievement over a three-year period. In 1985, Marshall was invited to Hollywood to add his hand prints to the "Rock and Roll Walk of Fame". In 2003, Marshall received an OBE honour from Buckingham Palace for "services to the music industry and to charity". On 19 March 2009 he was given the Freedom of the Borough of Milton Keynes. Marshall was a member of the Grand Order of Water Rats.

== Charities and endowments ==
Jim Marshall donated millions of pounds to the Royal National Orthopaedic Hospital in Stanmore, London, where he was treated for tuberculosis as a child. Marshall also supported a number of causes in his local community in Milton Keynes, such as Marshall Milton Keynes Athletic Club and Willen Hospice, while also being a supporter of the MK Dons football club. Marshalls were one of the earliest shirt sponsors for Milton Keynes Dons.

Marshall was a member of the Grand Order of Water Rats, serving in office for the charitable entertainment fraternity.

The 400-seat Jim Marshall Auditorium at The Stables Theatre, Wavendon, Milton Keynes is named after him, and celebrates his friendship with Sir John Dankworth and Dame Cleo Laine, the theatre's founders.

== Death, legacy and tribute ==
"I consider myself very fortunate to have known the late Jim Marshall. He was such a fantastic individual. Not only did he create the loudest, most effective, brilliant-sounding rock 'n' roll amplifier ever designed, but he was a caring, hardworking family man who remained true to his integrity to the very end. His work ethic was unequaled and his passion unrivaled."

— Guns N' Roses guitarist Slash.

Jim Marshall died on 5 April 2012, at a hospice in Milton Keynes. He was 88 years old. Musicians including Paul McCartney, Slash, Dave Mustaine, and Nikki Sixx paid tribute. Marshall has been cited, along with Leo Fender, Les Paul and Seth Lover, as one of the four forefathers of rock music equipment. The Download Festival named their main stage for him at the 2012 festival.

Every year on 5 April guitarists from all over the world post videos containing 1 minute of feedback, instead of 1 minute of silence, as a tribute.

On 6 April 2013 musicians and music lovers held a tribute music festival in Hanwell, West London, the town where Jim Marshall sold his first amplifier. A plaque was unveiled near the site.
