= Ivor Arbiter =

British drum designer (1929–2005)

- Born: 31 December 1929; Balham, South London, England
- Died: 26 July 2005 (aged 75); London, England
- Occupation: Drum designer
- Years active: 1950s-2003
- Known for: Designing the Beatles drop-t logo

The original Beatles drop-t logo

Ivor David Arbiter (31 December 1929 – 26 July 2005) was an English drum designer, manufacturer, instrument salesman, and entrepreneur. In his early career, he was the owner and operator of a specialty drum shop in the West End of London. Later, Arbiter founded or co-founded several instrument companies, including Arbiter–Western, Dallas–Arbiter, Hayman drums and CBS–Arbiter. He is credited with designing the Beatles' original drop-t logo, and bringing karaoke to the UK.

== Early career ==
Born in Balham, South London in 1929, Arbiter grew up in the city's West End. He began his career by opening Drum City, a drum speciality shop, on Shaftesbury Avenue in London. In the late 1950s, his shop quickly became a regular hangout for jazz drummers. Soon after, Arbiter became the UK franchise for Fender guitars and introduced the first Fender Stratocaster to Britain.

== Beatles logo ==
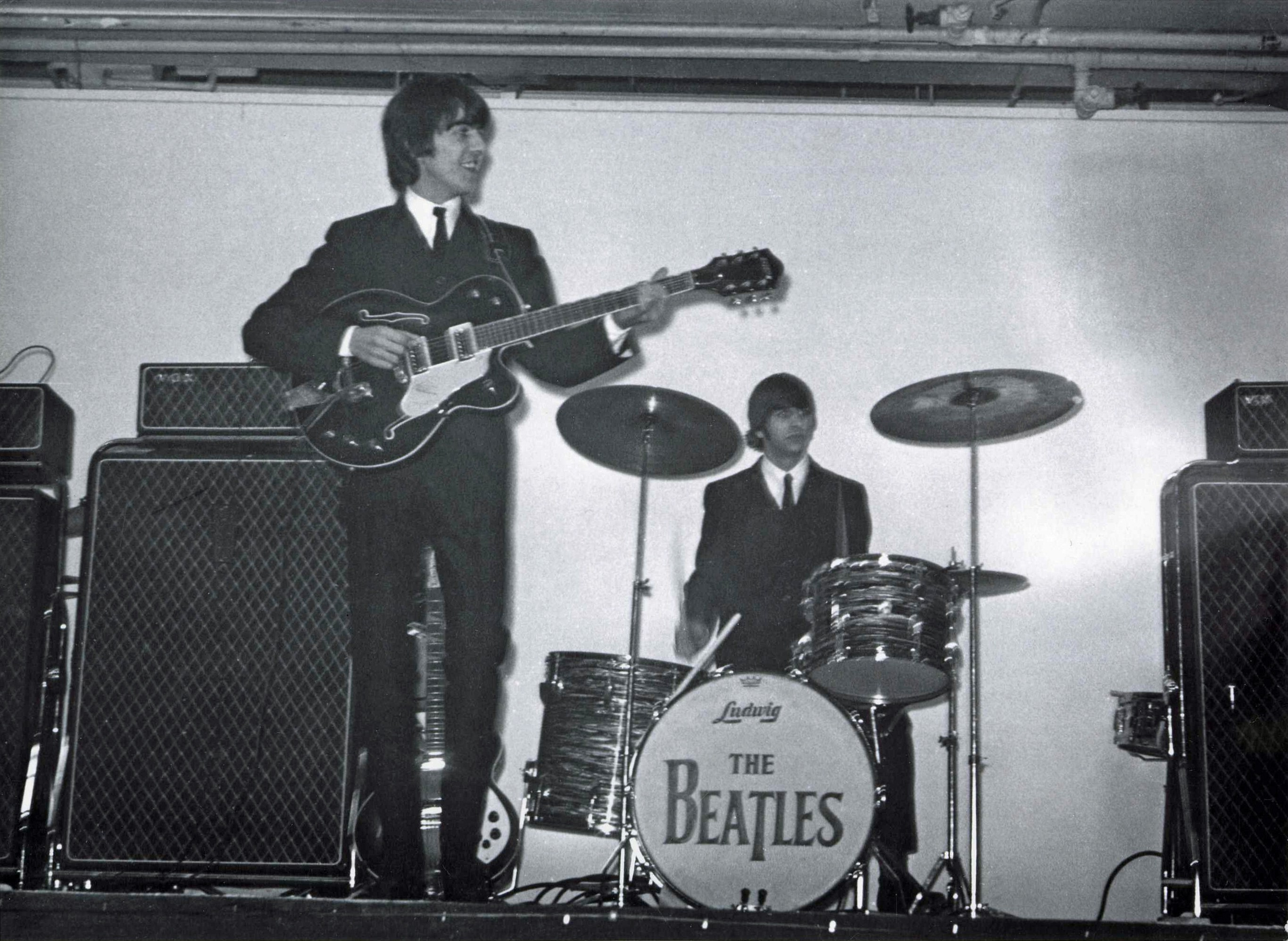
Ringo playing on Arbiter's kit in Belfast, 1964

In the early 1960s, Arbiter secured exclusive rights to sell Ludwig drums. Ringo Starr, interested in a Black Oyster Pearl drum kit, then only available through Ludwig, approached Arbiter in early 1963. Starr insisted that a large Ludwig logo be printed on the bass drum head, which was not available. Brian Epstein suggested that the drum head also include a Beatles logo, and Arbiter decided on a design including a large Beatles logo with enough room to fit a Ludwig logo on the top. He sketched a logo mockup on the back of a cigarette package and paid a local signmaker, Eddie Stokes, five pounds to paint the logo on the drum head.

== Other ventures ==
Arbiter continued to find success in the music market, selling equipment to musicians including Brian Bennett, Jeff Beck, and Jimi Hendrix. In 1966, Arbiter established a new guitar company, Arbiter–Western, which was sold to Dallas in 1969. Arbiter became the company's deputy chairman and the company was renamed Dallas–Arbiter.

While there, Arbiter's work included launching a new line of Hayman drums, considered the loudest on the market. In 1974, Arbiter left Dallas–Arbiter and began a new venture, CBS–Arbiter. Arbiter introduced Autotune in 1975, which allowed drums to be quickly replaced and retensioned. In the late 1980s, while visiting Japan, Arbiter discovered karaoke and began importing and manufacturing karaoke machines. In 2001, Arbiter received a lifetime achievement award from the Music Industries Association.

Ivor was also the Chairman of Isthmian League Premier Division side Hendon FC, originally sponsoring the club's shirts with the Fender guitar logo before taking the job from August 1994 to his death. With Hendon, they won back-to-back Isthmian League Full Members' Cups from 1997/98-1998/99, doing the double the second time, also winning the Middlesex Senior Cup in the same season, a title to which they would go onto win 3 consecutively between 01/02 and 03/04.

Arbiter retired in 2003 and died in London in 2005 after a battle with cancer.
