= Dallas Rangemaster Treble Booster =

Audio effects unit

The Dallas Rangemaster Treble Booster was an effects unit made for guitarists in the 1960s. Its function was two-fold: to increase the signal strength of the guitar going into the amplifier, and to increase tones at the high end of the spectrum (a treble booster).

The need for a treble booster arose in the mid-1960s, as British tube amplifiers such as the Vox AC30 or Marshall JTM45 tended to produce a slightly dark, muddy sound when overdriven, particularly when used with humbucking pickups. A pre-amplifier that also boosted treble proved a solution. Additionally, the vintage components in the Rangemaster circuitry could add characteristic distortion and overtones to color the guitar sound, much in the way of the more modern overdrive pedals.

== History and description ==
The Rangemaster Treble Booster was first made in the 1965 by London company Dallas Musical Ltd., incorporated in 1959. It made guitars and amplifiers under different brand names, including Dallas, Shaftesbury, and Rangemaster. The Rangemaster's engineer is unknown.

The unit is simple and consists of a grey folded metal casing with an on/off switch, a potentiometer controlling the boost setting, and in- and output jacks. It was designed to sit on top of an amplifier rather than on the floor, where most effects units live. The circuit inside the Rangemaster is a single stage Common Emitter PNP amplifier which utilizes just nine electrical components, including the potentiometer. Three carbon compound resistors, a germanium Mullard OC44 transistor, two film capacitors and two aluminum electrolytic capacitors find themselves mounted over a piece of terminal strip inside the unit's chassis and the UK Welwyn 10k ohm potentiometer was mounted to the body of the chassis via two mounting screws, along with the input jack and bypass switch. A further distinguishing feature of the Rangemaster when compared to other effects units is the hardwired output cable, which extends out of the back of the unit and connects directly to the amplifier, rather than an output jack which the user would plug their own cable into. The unit was powered by a standard nine-volt battery, which sat inside the chassis.

The advent of higher fidelity amplifiers and stompbox based effects units sent the Rangemaster out of fashion. In recent years, there has been a resurgence in demand for the vintage units. The number of Rangemaster Treble Boosters that were built is unknown, however there is limited supply on the second-hand market. This has made them a highly sought after collector's item. In Premier Guitar, Kenny Rardin describes his quest for one of the effects, which started with puzzlement over how Eric Clapton and Ritchie Blackmore achieved their tone; he spent years looking for a Rangemaster. The simplicity of the circuit paired with the rarity of the original unit has made the Rangemaster a prime candidate for clones and copies, which will often feature negligible changes to the actual circuit, and yet fetch a far lower price.

Other notable users whose sound depended heavily on the Rangemaster include Rory Gallagher, Brian May, Tony Iommi, Marc Bolan and Billy Gibbons.

Rumours of Eric Clapton having used a Rangemaster during his stint with John Mayall's Blues Breakers have never been confirmed. Photos of the recording sessions of the "Blues Breakers With Eric Clapton" exist, but a Rangemaster Treble Booster is not visible in any of them. It is assumed the rumours started in the late 1990s when clones of the Rangemaster Treble Booster began to appear.
