= Treble booster =

Effects unit boosting treble frequencies

Treble booster into clean amp
A treble booster (Rangemaster clone) into a clean amp. The gain is progressively increased.

Treble booster into crunch amp
A treble booster (Rangemaster clone) into a crunch amp. High frequencies and distortion increase a lot.

Treble booster into distorted amp
A treble booster (Rangemaster clone) into a distorted amp. High frequencies and distortion increase, giving a very tight and cutting sound.

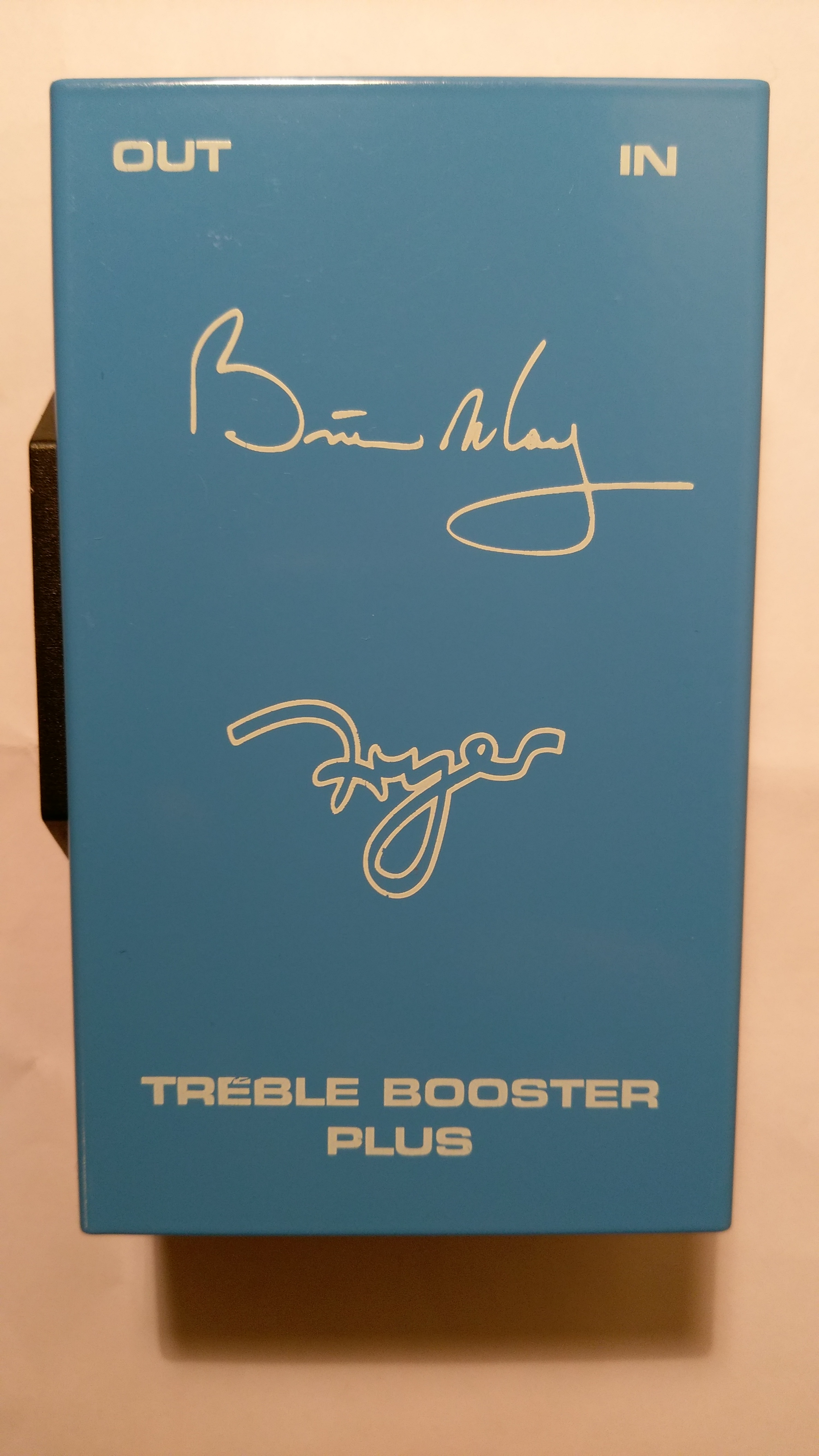
Fryer Sound Treble Booster Plus

A treble booster is an effects unit used by guitarists to increase the high end of their tonal spectrum. Many units boost the overall volume as well. Treble boosters were commonly used by guitarists in the 1960s and 1970s. During the last couple of decades, their popularity has increased again and many clones and reissues of the classic circuits have become available.

Many treble boosters made in the 1960s were designed to not boost the signal much. Vox even decreased the output of the American made version of their treble booster because they were afraid that the signal would overload the amplifier's input stage. Today, overdriving the input is considered one of the key features of a treble booster.

Popularized by guitarists such as Tony Iommi, Ritchie Blackmore, Rory Gallagher, Brian May, and Marc Bolan, treble boosters were used to overdrive amplifiers (mostly dark sounding, British tube models such as Marshall Bluesbreakers and Vox AC30s) in order to create a more distorted yet focused sound. They came up in the mid-1960s. By the 1980s they had fallen out of use. Guitarists used overdrive pedals instead, in a similar fashion. But the circuit and its derivatives have experienced a great revival in the 21st century, thanks to the many boutique builders who have rediscovered the circuit. While IC-based overdrive pedals remain far more popular than treble boosters, some players prefer the less compressed and more dynamic response of Rangemaster-family boosters.

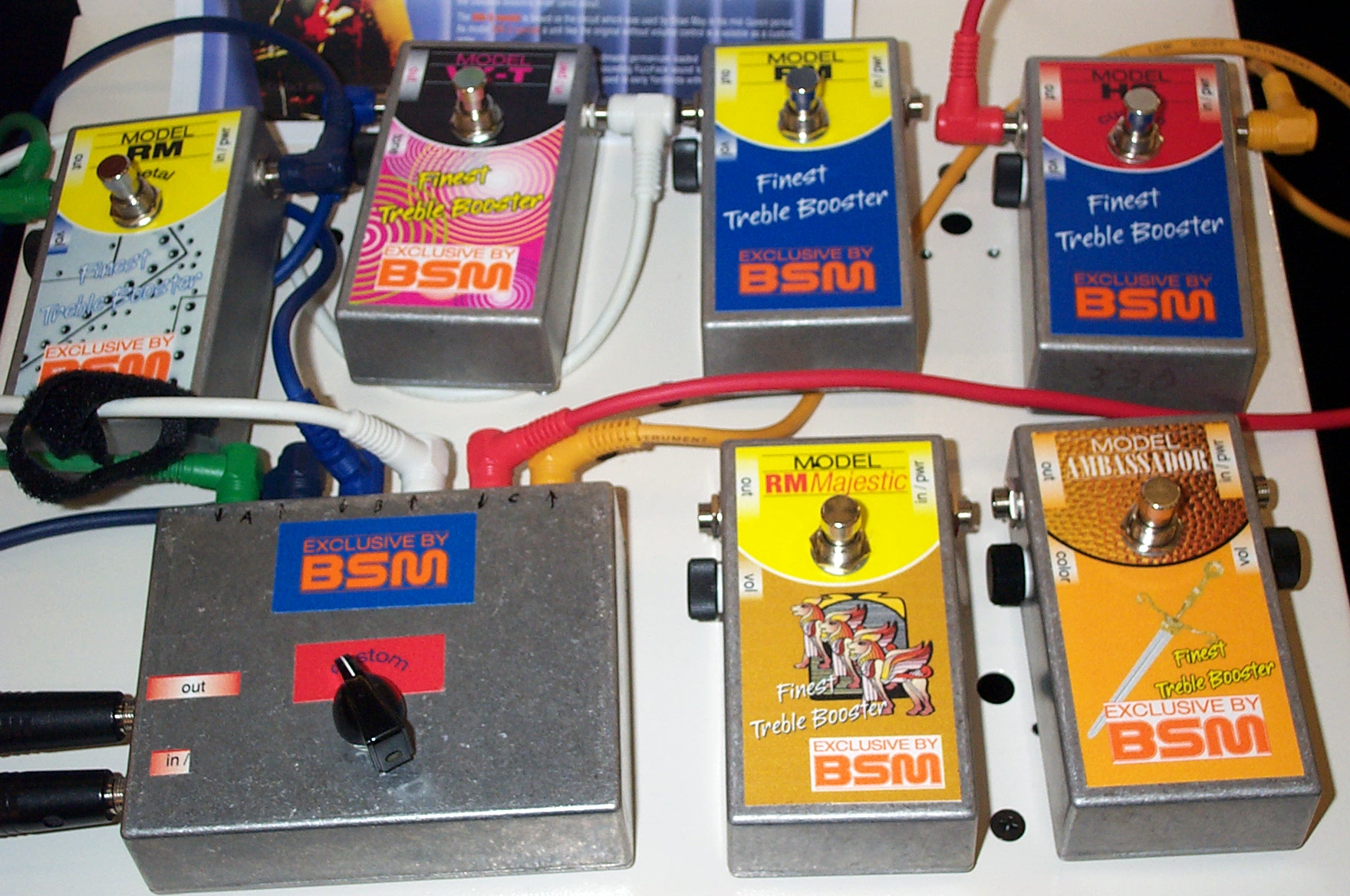
BSM Treble Boosters

== Dallas Rangemaster ==
One of the earliest treble boosters was the Dallas Rangemaster. Unlike most of today's clones, the original Rangemaster was not a pedal, but a box meant to be placed on top of the amplifier. The circuit makes use of a single OC71 or OC44 germanium transistor.

The original Rangemaster was an important ingredient for Brian May, Tony Iommi, Billy Gibbons, Marc Bolan or Rory Gallagher in finding their personal signature sound. Later some of these artists switched to close derivative circuits or tweaked clones - Tony Iommi's Rangemaster for example was modified to be full-range.

== Hornby Skewes ==
Just like the Dallas Rangemaster, the Hornby Skewes treble booster was an amp-top unit.

While early Hornby Skewes Treble Booster units used a germanium transistor, the later, better-known version features a silicon transistor. Rumours about a JFET version may source from a misread part number.

It is prominently featured on Jethro Tull's Aqualung album.

It was also used by Ritchie Blackmore during the 1960s until 1974, when it was replaced by a modified AIWA tape recorder.

Hornby Skewes also made a bass booster and a treble and bass booster, the Hornby Selectatone T.B.2.

== Vox ==
Vox made a variety of boosters that were meant to be plugged directly into amps or guitars, including the model V806 Treble Booster. Roger McGuinn installed one into his Rickenbacker guitar in the 1960s.

== Electro-Harmonix ==
Electro-Harmonix used to make treble boosters in two different enclosures. The Screaming Bird was a plug-in device, whereas the Screaming Tree was a foot-pedal. The circuits were supposedly identical. In 2009 the pedal was reissued, bearing the Screaming Bird name.

== Colorsound Power Boost ==
The Colorsound Power Boost is a treble and bass booster that runs on 18 volts, using two nine-volt batteries. David Gilmour used this orange coloured unit, but is often misunderstood to have used an Orange brand Treble Booster. Other notable users include Gary Moore. Later on the circuit was modified to run on 9V and sold as the Colorsound Overdriver.
