= Marshall Bluesbreaker =

Models 1961 and 1962 guitar amplifiers made by Marshall Amplification

The Marshall Bluesbreaker is the popular name given to the Models 1961 and 1962 guitar amplifiers made by Marshall from 1964/65 to 1972.

The Bluesbreaker, which derives its nickname from being used by Eric Clapton with John Mayall & The Bluesbreakers, is credited with delivering "the sound that launched British blues-rock in the mid-1960s." It was Marshall's first combo amplifier, and was described as "arguably the most important [amplifier] in the company's history" and "the definitive rock amplifier."

== History ==
According to Robb Lawrence's The Early Years of the Les Paul Legacy, Jim Marshall initially gave Clapton a Model 1961 with 4×10" speakers, which was soon replaced with a 2×12" Model 1962. Clapton used the combo amplifier with his 1960 Gibson Les Paul Standard, allegedly.

Marshall's Model 1961/1962 combo amplifier entered the market at an affordable price—one third cheaper than a Vox AC30 and half the price of a Fender Bassman combo. Its reputation was cemented when Clapton, who had rejoined John Mayall & the Bluesbreakers, used one to record Blues Breakers with Eric Clapton—a set of sessions now widely regarded as "historic". After that, the combo became known as the "Bluesbreaker." The model was discontinued in 1972.

Due to its iconic status amongst collectors, the Bluesbreaker has become one of the most collectible and valuable vintage guitar amplifiers. According to a 2011 Vintage Guitar article ranking the twenty-five "most valuable amplifiers", the 1966/1967 Bluesbreaker is seventh on the list, with solid original examples fetching prices between US$8,300 and US$10,000.

=== Reissue ===
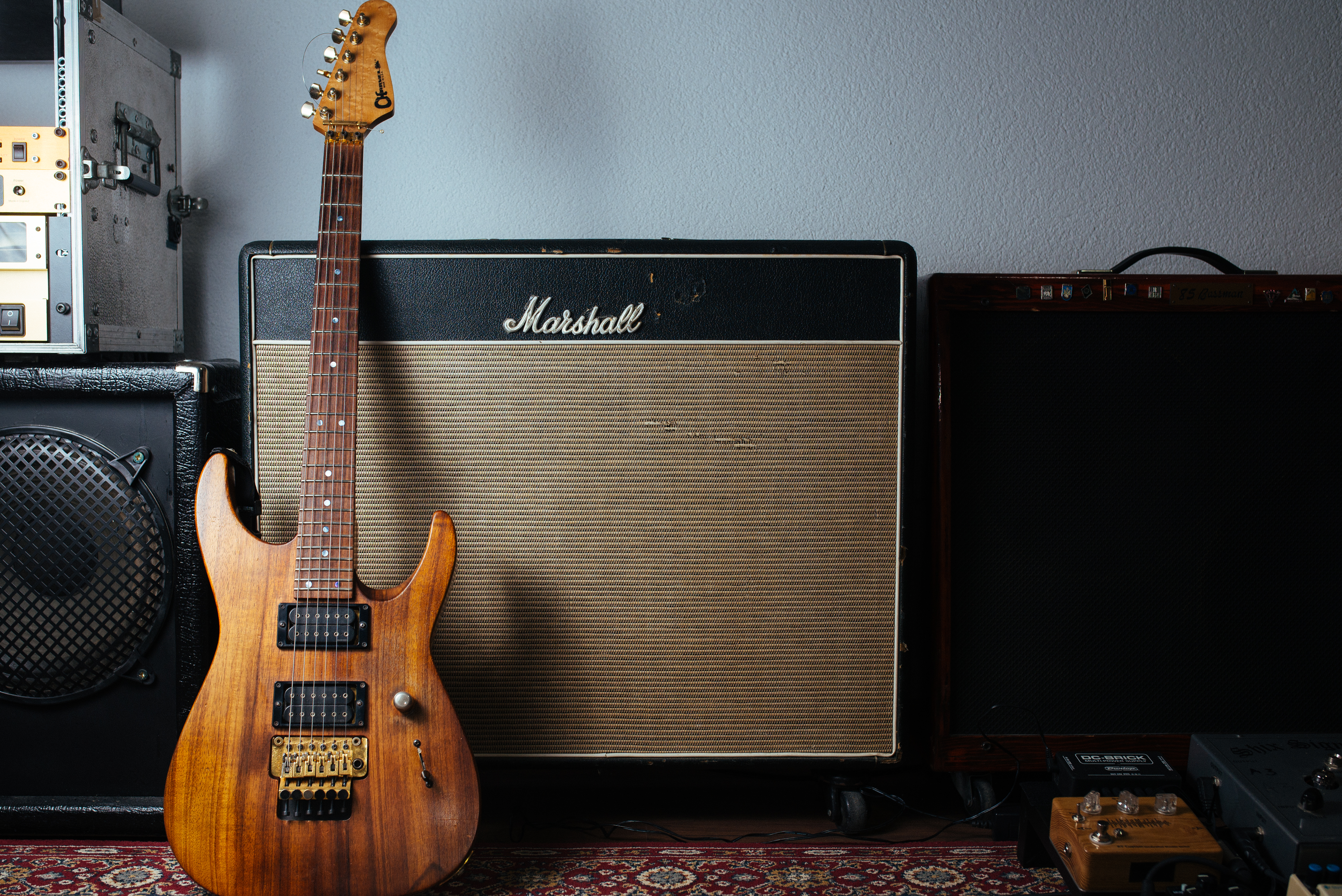
1962 Bluesbreaker reissue

Marshall reissued the 2×12" Bluesbreaker in 1989; the 4×10" was never reissued. This version used 6L6 tubes. A reissue called the 1962 Bluebreaker was available in the 2000s and used 5881 power tubes. An amplifier head, the 2245THW, was reissued in Marshall's "Handwired" series, with circuitry identical to the Bluesbreaker. Vintage Guitar called it a "fine high-end piece"; it was listed at $4800.

=== Pedals ===
In 1991, Marshall began making a Bluesbreaker overdrive pedal that was intended to emulate the sound of the original combo. In 1999, a second version of the pedal, the Bluesbreaker II, was released. The original version of the Bluesbreaker pedal grew popular after John Mayer used one for his album Continuum in 2008, with some sellers asking over $1000 for a pedal in 2023. As a result, Marshall reissued the original version of the pedal in 2023.

== Description, specifications and sound ==
Marshall's original Model 1961 and 1962 were basically the combo version of Marshall JTM45. Model 1961 was essentially the lead version of the Model 2245, fitted with tremolo and installed into an open backed speaker cabinet, while Model 1962 was the bass version of the JTM 45 (Model 1986), also fitted with tremolo and open backed cabinet. These amplifiers both feature the basic JTM 45 modified Fender Bassman circuit, which provided the origin of what became known as the "Marshall sound". The first versions of these combo amplifiers were made in 1964–1965, with Models 1961 and 1962 being fitted with 4×10" and 2×12" Celestion speakers respectively. An extremely rare 2×12" extension cabinet was also offered. A later model had a slightly thinner cabinet with different acoustics. Production JTM45 amplifiers used KT66 output tubes, which are credited with providing "a round, bell like tone with soft distortion character." Also contributing to the overall sound picture of the JTM45 series amplifiers was a GZ34 rectifier tube.

Marshall also made an 18-watt combo amplifier with 2×10" speakers (Model 1958) that looked like a smaller version of the Bluesbreaker, and is sometimes referred to as its "little brother".

=== Eric Clapton and the Bluesbreaker sound ===
The output of a typical Bluesbreaker was only about 35 watts, and thus the sound would break up at more moderate volumes as compared to larger amplifiers. It was precisely this distortion that Eric Clapton was after. Reportedly, Clapton told the engineer during the Bluesbreakers sessions that he should mic the amplifier from across the room, because he intended to play it as loud as possible. Producer Mike Vernon is credited with allowing Clapton to play in the studio as if he were playing live, and to improvise his solos played at full volume through the Marshall 1962 combo.

In comparison with the Marshall JTM45 half-stacks of the time, the open-back combo amps had less low and a bit more crisp high-end response, which suits the Les Paul well, especially when recording blues.

=== Modification ===
Since the Bluesbreaker ultimately derives from the Fender Bassman, it is possible to create an approximate reproduction of a Bluesbreaker by modifying a Bassman; in February 1993 Guitar Player magazine published this modification.
