= Crystal earpiece =

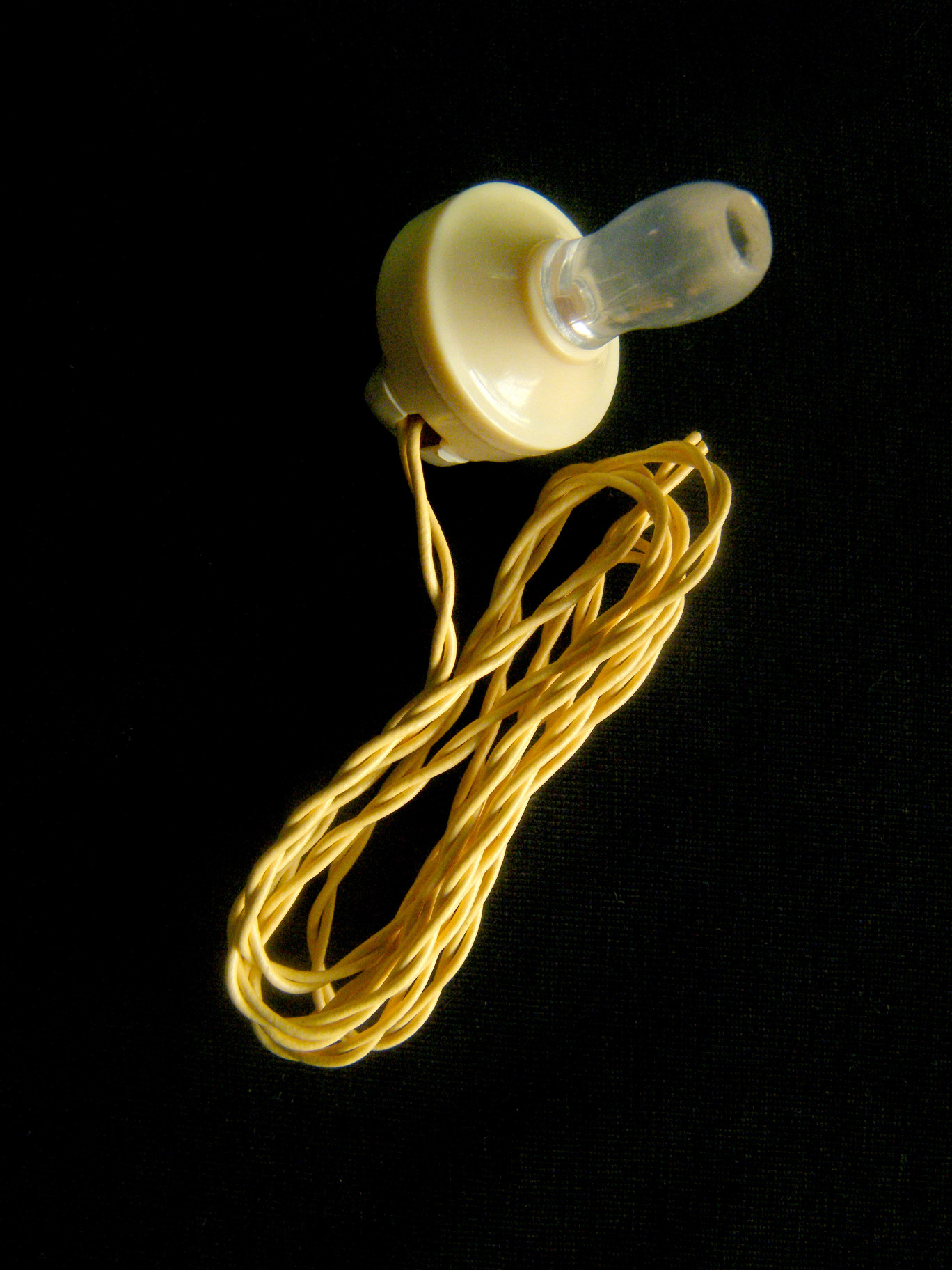
A crystal earpiece

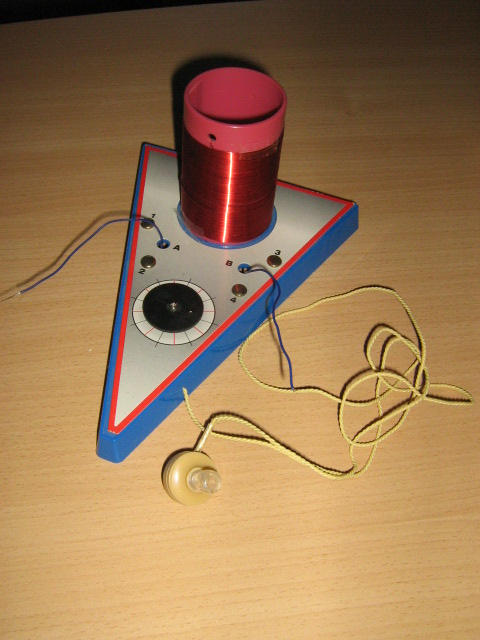
A crystal radio using piezoelectric earpiece

A crystal earpiece is a type of piezoelectric earphone, producing sound by using a piezoelectric crystal, a material that changes its shape when electricity is applied to it. It is usually designed to plug into the ear canal of the user.

== Operation ==
A crystal earpiece typically consists of a piezoelectric crystal with metal electrodes attached to either side, glued to a conical plastic or metal foil diaphragm, enclosed in a plastic case. The piezoelectric material used in early crystal earphones was Rochelle salt, but modern earphones use barium titanate, or less often quartz. When the audio signal is applied to the electrodes, the crystal bends back and forth a little with the signal, vibrating the diaphragm. The diaphragm pushes on the air, creating sound waves. The plastic earpiece casing confines the sound waves and conducts them efficiently into the ear canal, to the eardrum. The diaphragm is generally fixed at its outer edge, relying on bending to operate. The air path in the earpiece is generally a horn shape, with a narrowing column of air which increases the air displacement at the eardrum, increasing the volume.

== Application ==
Crystal earpieces are usually monaural devices with very low sound fidelity, but high sensitivity and impedance. Their peak use was probably with 1960s era transistor radios and hearing aids. They are not used with modern portable media players due to unacceptable sound quality. The main causes of poor performance with these earpieces are low diaphragm excursion, nonlinearity, in-band resonance and the very short horn shape of the earpiece casing. The resulting sound is very tinny and lacking in bass. Modern headphones use electromagnetic drivers that work similarly to speakers, with moving coils or moving iron cores in a magnetic field.

One remaining use for crystal earpieces is in crystal radios. Their very high sensitivity enables them to use the very weak signals produced by crystal radios, and their high impedance (on the order of 20 kilohms) is a good match for the typical crystal radio. They have also been used as microphones, with their high output requiring less amplification.

Crystal earpieces can also be used as rudimentary, low voltage, audio circuit troubleshooting tools; it is sufficient to touch the tip of the earpiece's audio connector on a point of interest while simultaneously touching the other (sleeve) connection with one's finger. The high impedance of the earpiece means that any audio-range signal applied to the tip of the connector will be heard in the earpiece. This quick-and-dirty technique can remove the need for setting up and probing with an oscilloscope or connecting an amplifier to the test point in the first instance.
