= Crystal radio =

Simple radio receiver circuit for AM reception

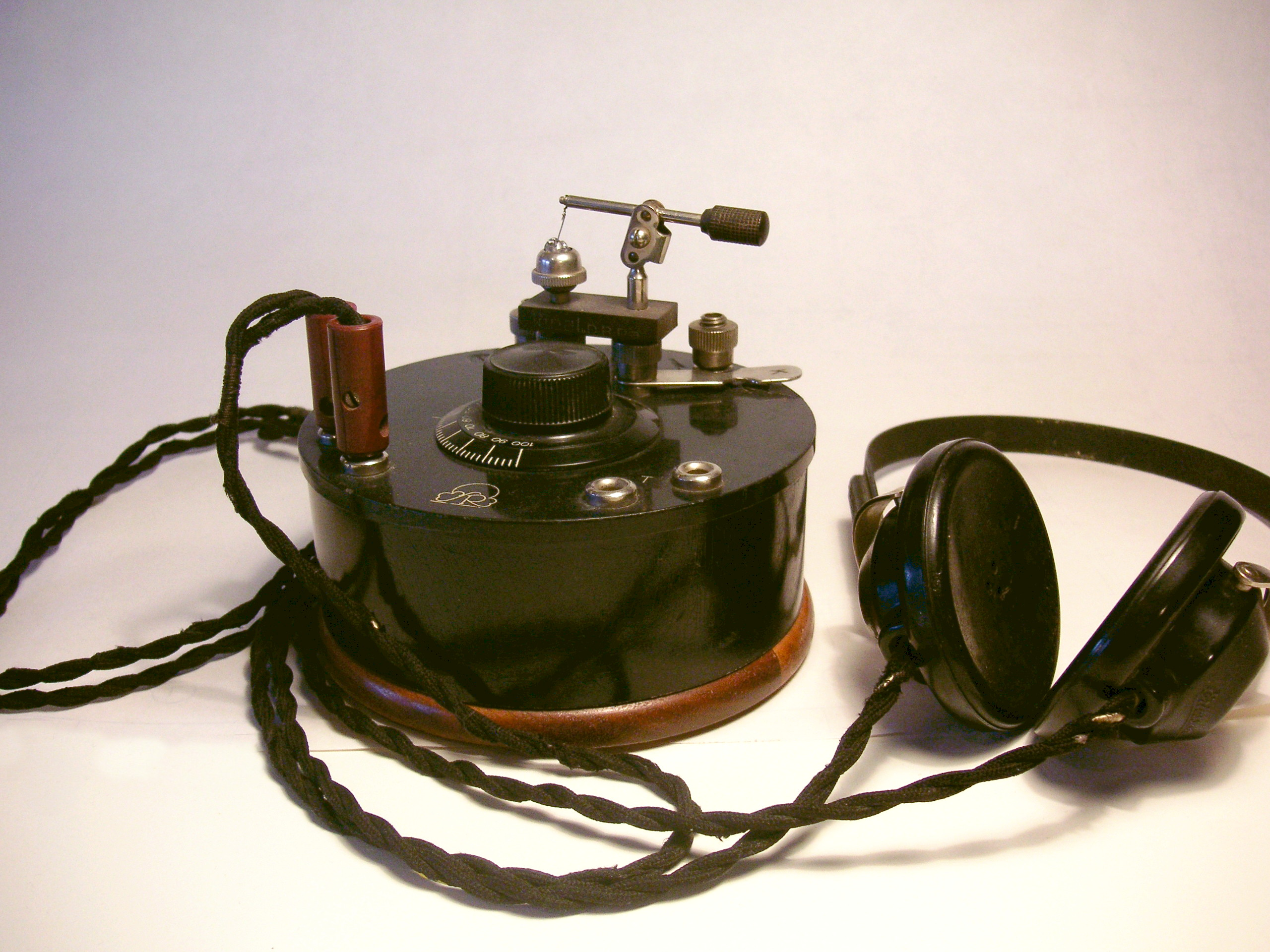
Swedish crystal radio from 1922 made by Radiola, with earphones. The device at top is the radio's cat's whisker detector. A second pair of earphone jacks is provided.

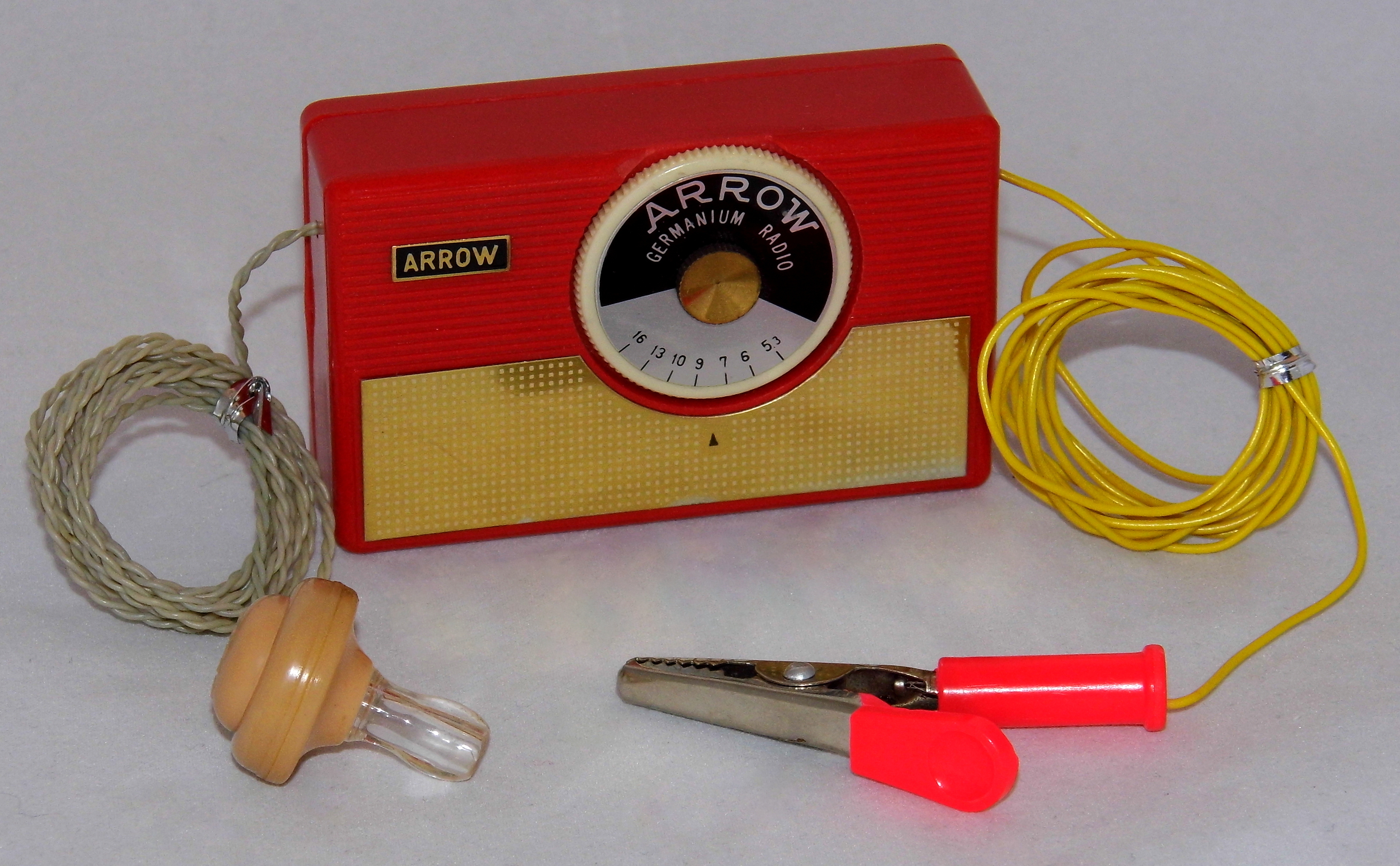
1970s-era Arrow crystal radio marketed to children. The earphone is on left. The antenna wire, right, has a clip to attach to metal objects such as a bedspring, which serve as an additional antenna to improve reception.

A crystal radio receiver, also called a crystal set, is a simple radio receiver, popular in the early days of radio. It uses only the power of the received radio wave to produce sound, needing no external power supply. It is named for its most important component, a crystal detector, originally made from a piece of crystalline mineral such as galena. This component is now called a diode.

Crystal radios are the simplest type of radio receiver and can be made with a few inexpensive parts, such as a wire for an antenna, a coil of wire, a capacitor, a crystal detector, and earphones. However they are passive receivers, while other radios use an amplifier powered by current from a battery or wall outlet to make the radio signal louder. Thus, crystal sets produce rather weak sound and must be listened to with sensitive earphones, and can receive stations only within a limited range of the transmitter.

The rectifying property of a contact between a mineral and a metal was discovered in 1874 by Karl Ferdinand Braun. Crystals were first used as a detector of radio waves in 1894 by Jagadish Chandra Bose, in his microwave optics experiments. They were first used as a demodulator for radio communication reception in 1902 by G. W. Pickard. Crystal radios were the first widely used type of radio receiver, and the main type used during the wireless telegraphy era. Sold and homemade by the millions, the inexpensive and reliable crystal radio was a major driving force in the introduction of radio to the public, contributing to the development of radio as an entertainment medium with the beginning of radio broadcasting around 1920. Manufacturers such as Crosley Radio Corporation marketed inexpensive crystal receivers during the early broadcasting boom.

Around 1920, crystal sets were superseded by the first amplifying receivers, which used vacuum tubes. With this technological advance, crystal sets became obsolete for commercial use but continued to be built by hobbyists, youth groups, and the Boy Scouts mainly as a way of learning about the technology of radio. They are still sold as educational devices, and there are groups of enthusiasts devoted to their construction.

Crystal radios receive amplitude modulated (AM) signals, although FM designs have been built. They can be designed to receive almost any radio frequency band, but most receive the AM broadcast band. A few receive shortwave bands, but strong signals are required. The first crystal sets received wireless telegraphy signals broadcast by spark-gap transmitters at frequencies as low as 20 kHz.

== Basic principles ==
Block diagram of a crystal radio receiver

Circuit diagram of a simple crystal radio

A crystal radio can be thought of as a radio receiver reduced to its essentials. It consists of at least these components:

- An antenna in which the radio wave induces electric currents.
- A resonant circuit (tuned circuit) which selects the frequency of the desired radio station from all the radio signals received by the antenna. The tuned circuit consists of a coil of wire (called an inductor) and a capacitor connected together. The circuit has a resonant frequency, and allows radio waves at that frequency to pass through to the detector while largely blocking waves at other frequencies. One or both of the coil or capacitor is adjustable, allowing the circuit to be tuned to different frequencies to select the station to receive. In some circuits a capacitor is not used and the antenna serves this function, as an antenna that is shorter than a quarter-wavelength of the radio waves it is meant to receive is capacitive.
- A semiconductor crystal detector that demodulates the radio signal to extract the audio signal (modulation). The crystal detector functions as a square law detector, demodulating the radio frequency alternating current to its audio frequency modulation. The detector's audio frequency output is converted to sound by the earphone. Early sets used a "cat whisker detector" consisting of a small piece of crystalline mineral such as galena with a fine wire touching its surface. The crystal detector was the component that gave crystal radios their name. Modern sets use modern semiconductor diodes, although some hobbyists still experiment with crystal or other detectors.
- An earphone to convert the audio signal to sound waves so they can be heard. The low power produced by a crystal receiver is insufficient to power a loudspeaker, hence earphones are used.

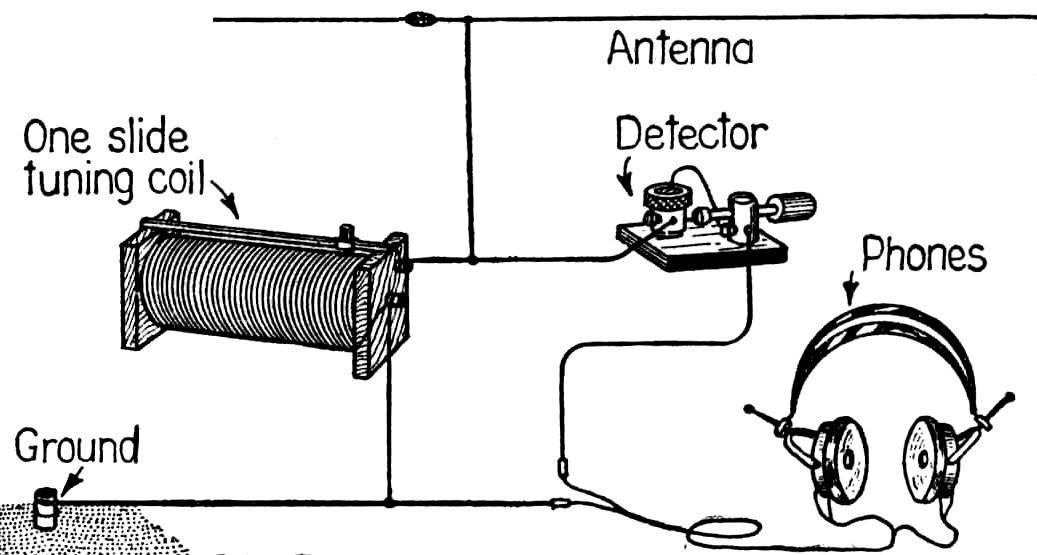
Pictorial diagram from 1922 showing the circuit of a crystal radio. This common circuit did not use a tuning capacitor, but used the capacitance of the antenna to form the tuned circuit with the coil. The detector was a cat whisker detector, consisting of a piece of galena with a thin wire in contact with it on a part of the crystal, making a diode contact

As a crystal radio has no power supply, the sound power produced by the earphone comes solely from the transmitter of the radio station being received, via the radio waves captured by the antenna. The power available to a receiving antenna decreases with the square of its distance from the radio transmitter. Even for a powerful commercial broadcasting station, if it is more than a few miles from the receiver the power received by the antenna is very small, typically measured in microwatts or nanowatts. In modern crystal sets, signals as weak as 50 picowatts at the antenna can be heard. Crystal radios can receive such weak signals without using amplification only due to the great sensitivity of human hearing, which can detect sounds with an intensity of only 10^{−16} W/cm^{2}. Therefore, crystal receivers have to be designed to convert the energy from the radio waves into sound waves as efficiently as possible. Even so, they are usually only able to receive stations within distances of about 25 miles for AM broadcast stations, although the radiotelegraphy signals used during the wireless telegraphy era could be received at hundreds of miles, and crystal receivers were even used for transoceanic communication during that period.

== Design ==
Commercial passive receiver development was abandoned with the advent of reliable vacuum tubes around 1920, and subsequent crystal radio research was primarily done by radio amateurs and hobbyists. Many different circuits have been used. The following sections discuss the parts of a crystal radio in greater detail.

=== Antenna ===
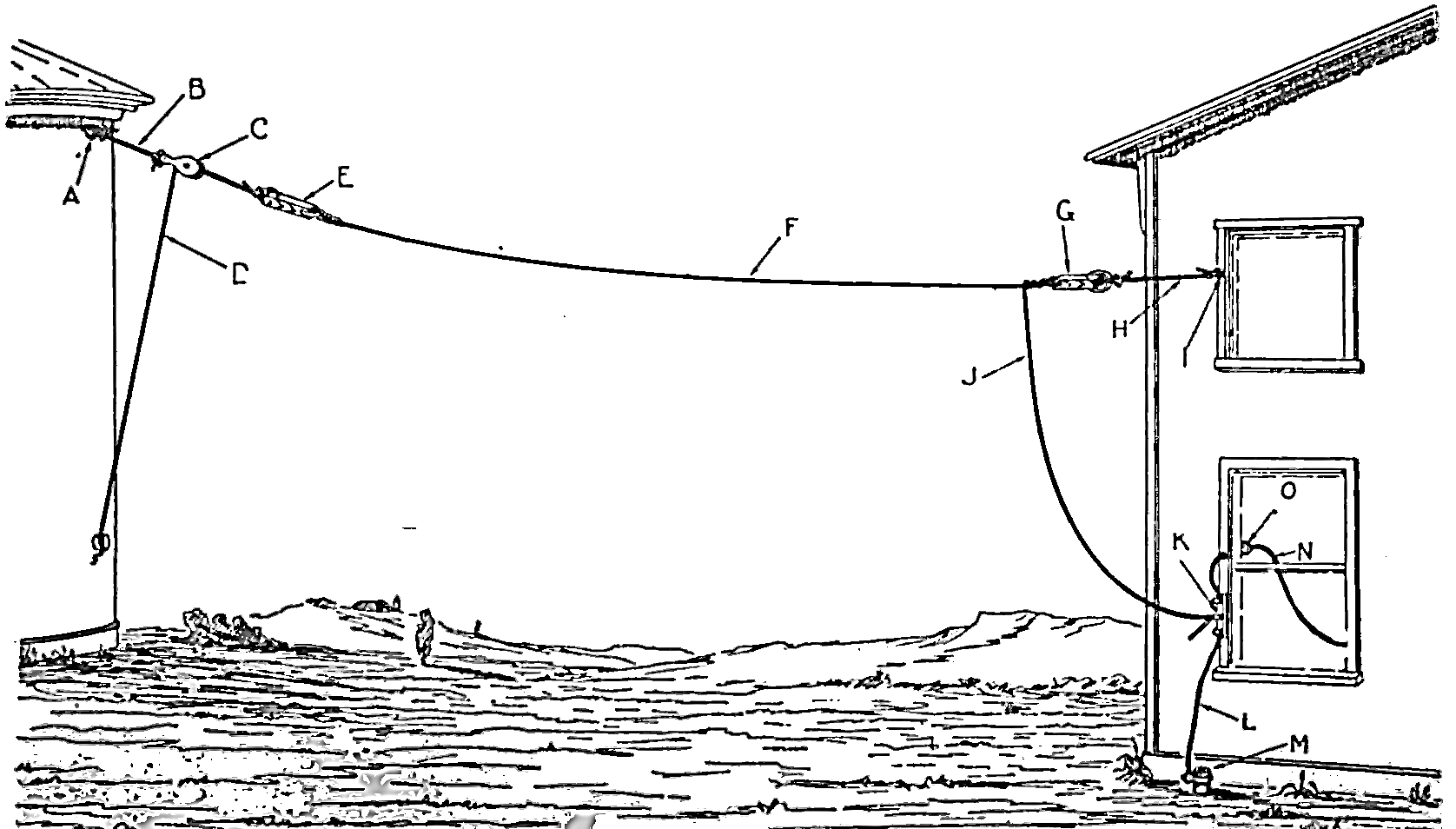
Diagram of an inverted-L antenna, a common wire antenna used with crystal radios

The antenna converts the energy in the electromagnetic radio waves to an alternating electric current in the antenna, which is connected to the tuning coil. Since, in a crystal radio, all the power comes from the antenna, it is important that the antenna collect as much power from the radio wave as possible. The larger an antenna, the more power it can intercept. Antennas of the type commonly used with crystal sets are most effective when their length is close to a multiple of a quarter-wavelength of the radio waves they are receiving. Since the length of the waves used with crystal radios is very long (AM broadcast band waves are 182–566 metres or 597–1,857 feet long) the antenna is made as long as possible, from a long wire, in contrast to the whip antennas or ferrite loopstick antennas used in modern radios.

Serious crystal radio hobbyists use "inverted L" and "T" type antennas, consisting of hundreds of feet of wire suspended as high as possible between buildings or trees, with a feed wire attached in the center or at one end leading down to the receiver. However, more often, random lengths of wire dangling out windows are used. A popular practice in early days (particularly among apartment dwellers) was to use existing large metal objects, such as bedsprings, fire escapes, and barbed wire fences as antennas.

=== Ground ===
The wire antennas used with crystal receivers are monopole antennas which develop their output voltage with respect to ground. The receiver thus requires a connection to ground (the earth) as a return circuit for the current. The ground wire was attached to a radiator, water pipe, or a metal stake driven into the ground. In early days if an adequate ground connection could not be made a counterpoise was sometimes used. A good ground is more important for crystal sets than it is for powered receivers, as crystal sets are designed to have a low input impedance needed to transfer power efficiently from the antenna. A low resistance ground connection (preferably below 25 Ω) is necessary because any resistance in the ground reduces available power from the antenna. In contrast, modern receivers are voltage-driven devices, with high input impedance, hence little current flows in the antenna/ground circuit. Also, mains powered receivers are grounded adequately through their power cords, which are in turn attached to the earth through the building wiring.

=== Tuned circuit ===
The earliest crystal receiver circuit did not have a tuned circuit.

The tuned circuit, consisting of a coil and a capacitor connected together, acts as a resonator, similar to a tuning fork. Electric charge, induced in the antenna by the radio waves, flows rapidly back and forth between the plates of the capacitor through the coil. The circuit has a high impedance at the desired radio signal's frequency, but a low impedance at all other frequencies. Hence, signals at undesired frequencies pass through the tuned circuit to ground, while the desired frequency is instead passed on to the detector (diode) and stimulates the earpiece and is heard. The frequency of the station received is the resonant frequency f of the tuned circuit, determined by the capacitance C of the capacitor and the inductance L of the coil:
$$f = \frac {1}{ 2 \pi \sqrt {LC}}.$$

The circuit can be adjusted to different frequencies by varying the inductance (L), the capacitance (C), or both, "tuning" the circuit to the frequencies of different radio stations. In the lowest-cost sets, the inductor was made variable via a spring contact pressing against the windings that could slide along the coil, thereby introducing a larger or smaller number of turns of the coil into the circuit, varying the inductance. Alternatively, a variable capacitor is used to tune the circuit. Some modern crystal sets use a ferrite core tuning coil, in which a ferrite magnetic core is moved into and out of the coil, thereby varying the inductance by changing the magnetic permeability (this eliminated the less reliable mechanical contact).

The antenna is an integral part of the tuned circuit and its reactance contributes to determining the circuit's resonant frequency. Antennas usually act as a capacitance, as antennas shorter than a quarter-wavelength have capacitive reactance. Many early crystal sets did not have a tuning capacitor, and relied instead on the capacitance inherent in the wire antenna (in addition to significant parasitic capacitance in the coil) to form the tuned circuit with the coil.

The earliest crystal receivers did not have a tuned circuit at all, and just consisted of a crystal detector connected between the antenna and ground, with an earphone across it. Since this circuit lacked any frequency-selective elements besides the broad resonance of the antenna, it had little ability to reject unwanted stations, so all stations within a wide band of frequencies were heard in the earphone (in practice the most powerful usually drowns out the others). It was used in the earliest days of radio, when only one or two stations were within a crystal set's limited range.

==== Impedance matching ====
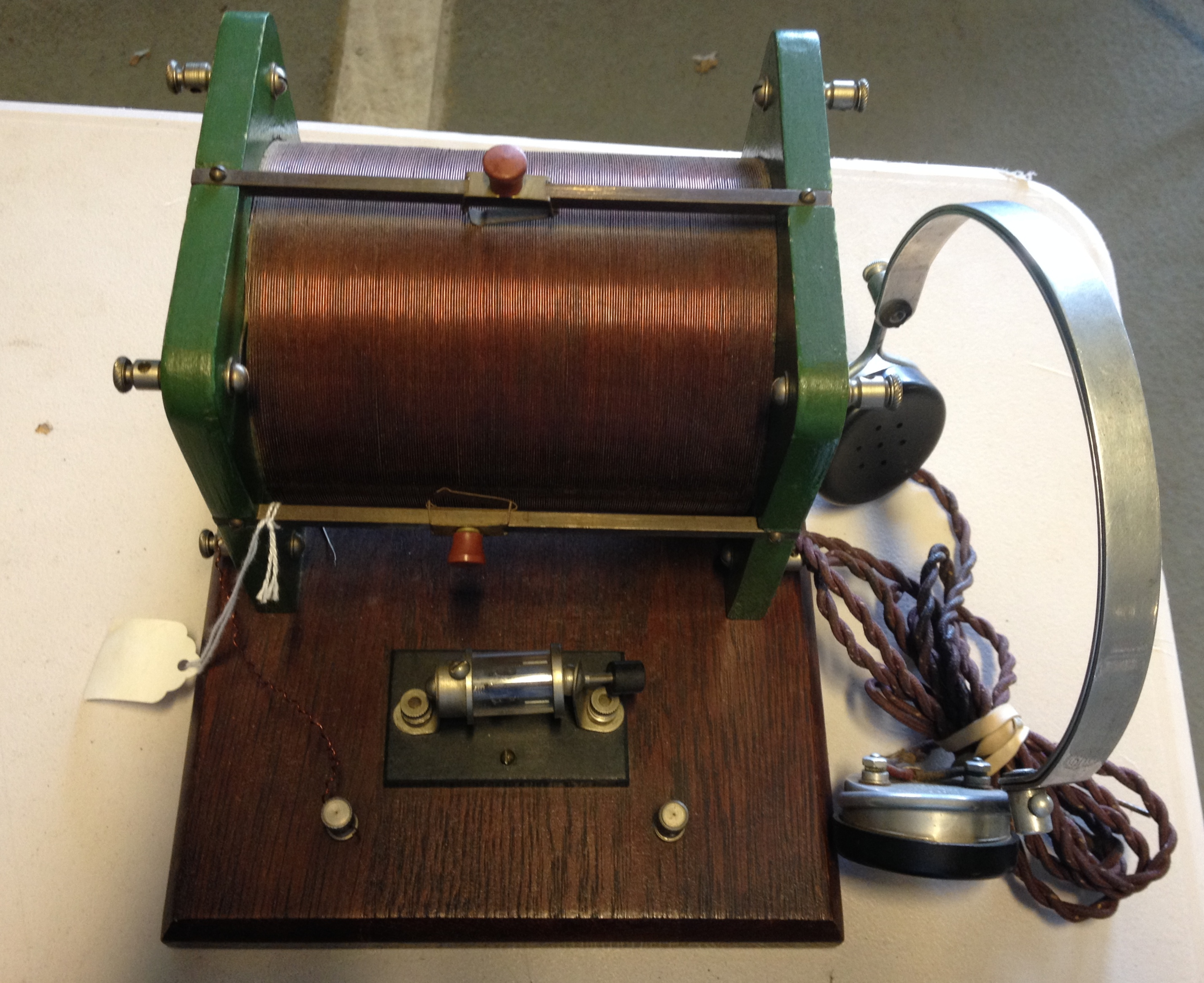
"Two slider" crystal radio circuit. and example from 1920s. The two sliding contacts on the coil allowed the impedance of the radio to be adjusted to match the antenna as the radio was tuned, resulting in stronger reception. The capacitance which created the tuned circuit was provided by the parasitic capacitance of the coil, and the antenna.

An important principle used in crystal radio design to transfer maximum power to the earphone is impedance matching. According to the maximum power transfer theorem, the maximum power is transferred from one part of a circuit to another when the impedance of one circuit is the complex conjugate of that of the other; this implies that the two circuits should have equal resistance. However, in crystal sets, the impedance of the antenna-ground system (around 10–200 ohms) is usually lower than the impedance of the receiver's tuned circuit (thousands of ohms at resonance), and also varies depending on the quality of the ground attachment, length of the antenna, and the frequency to which the receiver is tuned. Therefore, in improved receiver circuits, in order to match the antenna impedance to the receiver's impedance, the antenna was connected across only a portion of the tuning coil's turns. This made the tuning coil act as an impedance matching transformer (in an autotransformer connection) in addition to providing the tuning function. The antenna's low resistance was increased (transformed) by a factor equal to the square of the turns ratio (the ratio of the number of turns the antenna was connected to, to the total number of turns of the coil), to match the resistance across the tuned circuit. In the "two-slider" circuit, popular during the wireless era, both the antenna and the detector circuit were attached to the coil with sliding contacts, allowing (interactive) adjustment of both the resonant frequency and the turns ratio. Alternatively a multiposition switch was used to select taps on the coil. These controls were adjusted until the station sounded loudest in the earphone.

==== Problem of selectivity ====
Direct-coupled circuit with taps for impedance matching

One of the drawbacks of crystal sets is that they are vulnerable to interference from stations near in frequency to the desired station. Often two or more stations are heard simultaneously. This is because the simple tuned circuit does not reject nearby signals well; it allows a wide band of frequencies to pass through, that is, it has a large bandwidth (low Q factor) compared to modern receivers, giving the receiver low selectivity.

The crystal detector worsened the problem, because it has relatively low resistance, thus it "loaded" the tuned circuit, drawing significant current and thus damping the oscillations, reducing its Q factor so it allowed through a broader band of frequencies. In many circuits, the selectivity was improved by connecting the detector and earphone circuit to a tap across only a fraction of the coil's turns. This reduced the impedance loading of the tuned circuit, as well as improving the impedance match with the detector.

==== Inductive coupling ====
Inductively-coupled circuit with impedance matching. This type was used in most quality crystal receivers in the early 20th century.

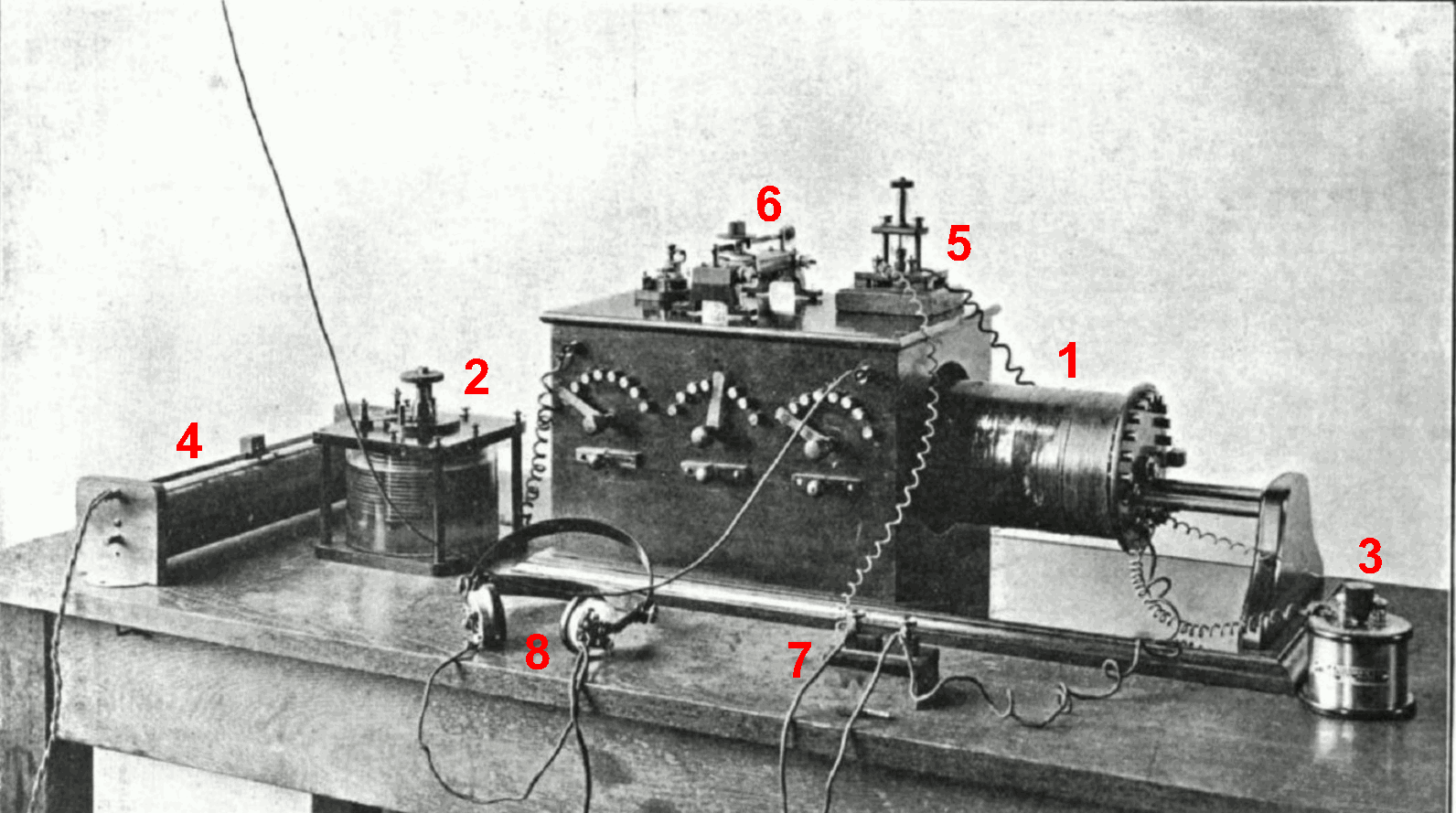
Amateur-built crystal receiver with "loose coupler" antenna transformer, Belfast, around 1914

In more sophisticated crystal receivers, the tuning coil is replaced with an adjustable air core antenna coupling transformer which improves the selectivity by a technique called loose coupling. This consists of two magnetically coupled coils of wire, one (the primary) attached to the antenna and ground and the other (the secondary) attached to the rest of the circuit. The current from the antenna creates an alternating magnetic field in the primary coil, which induced a current in the secondary coil which was then rectified and powered the earphone. Each of the coils functions as a tuned circuit; the primary coil resonated with the capacitance of the antenna (or sometimes another capacitor), and the secondary coil resonated with the tuning capacitor. Both the primary and secondary were tuned to the frequency of the station. The two circuits interacted to form a resonant transformer.

Reducing the coupling between the coils, by physically separating them so that less of the magnetic field of one intersects the other, reduces the mutual inductance, narrows the bandwidth, and results in much sharper, more selective tuning than that produced by a single tuned circuit. However, the looser coupling also reduced the power of the signal passed to the second circuit. The transformer was made with adjustable coupling, to allow the listener to experiment with various settings to gain the best reception.

One design common in early days, called a "loose coupler", consisted of a smaller secondary coil inside a larger primary coil. The smaller coil was mounted on a rack so it could be slid linearly in or out of the larger coil. If radio interference was encountered, the smaller coil would be slid further out of the larger, loosening the coupling, narrowing the bandwidth, and thereby rejecting the interfering signal.

The antenna coupling transformer also functioned as an impedance matching transformer, that allowed a better match of the antenna impedance to the rest of the circuit. One or both of the coils usually had several taps which could be selected with a switch, allowing adjustment of the number of turns of that transformer and hence the "turns ratio".

Coupling transformers were difficult to adjust, because the three adjustments, the tuning of the primary circuit, the tuning of the secondary circuit, and the coupling of the coils, were all interactive, and changing one affected the others.

=== Crystal detector ===
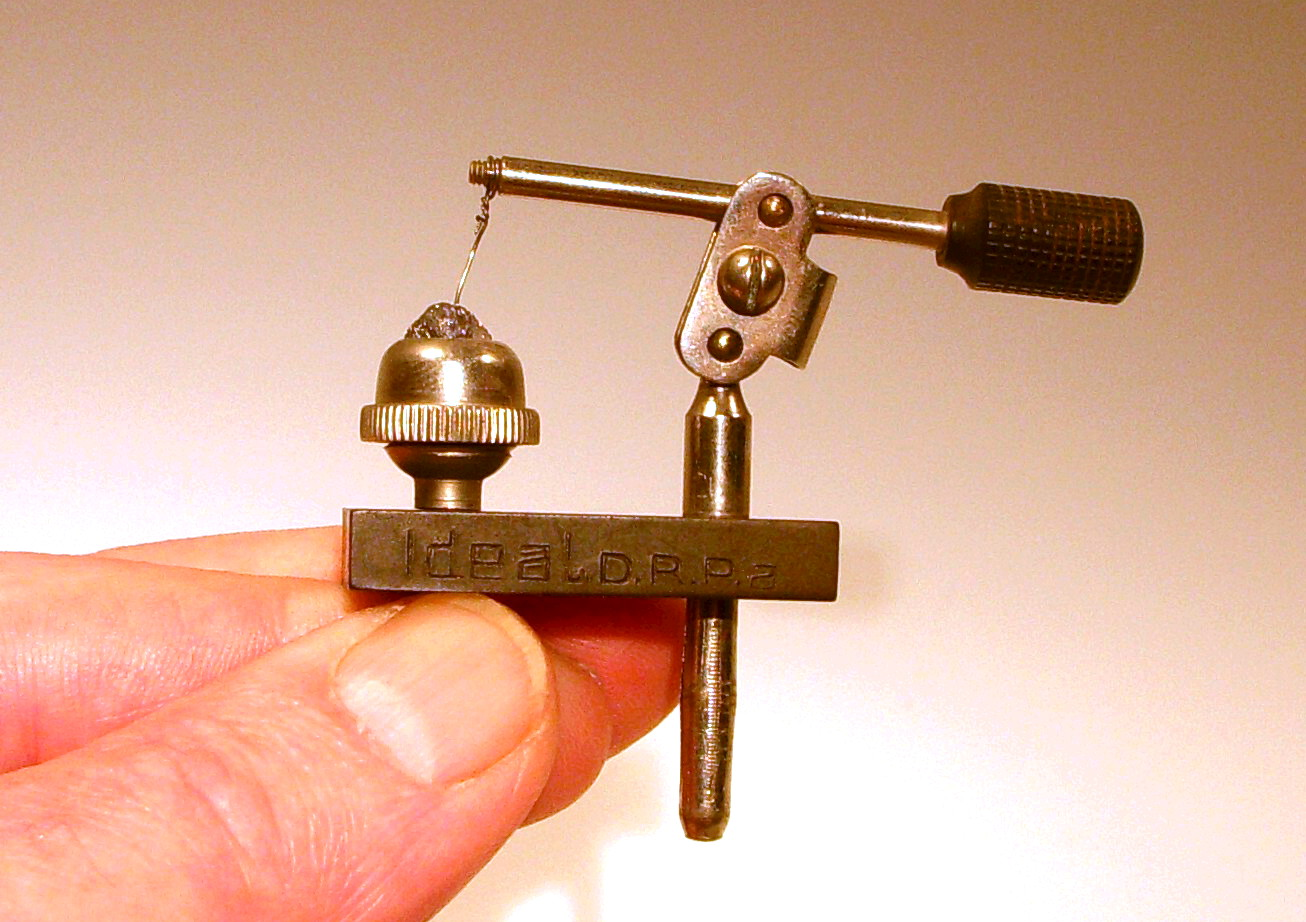
Galena crystal detector

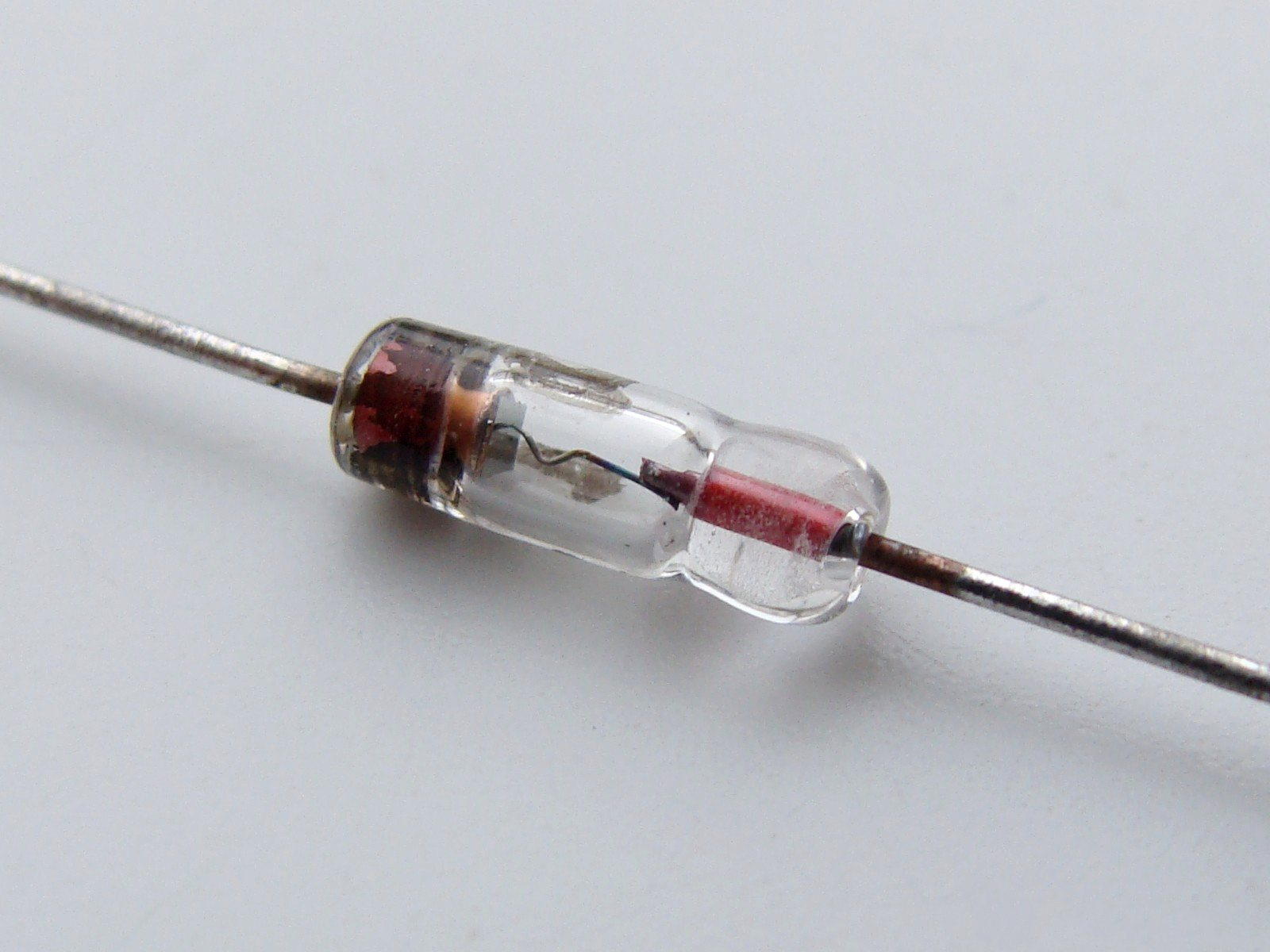
Germanium diode used in modern crystal radios (about 3 mm long)

How the crystal detector works. (A) The amplitude modulated radio signal from the tuned circuit. The rapid oscillations are the radio frequency carrier wave. The audio signal (the sound) is contained in the slow variations (modulation) of the amplitude (hence the term amplitude modulation, AM) of the waves. This signal cannot be converted to sound by the earphone, because the audio excursions are the same on both sides of the axis, averaging out to zero, which would result in no net motion of the earphone's diaphragm. (B) The crystal conducts current better in one direction than the other, producing a signal whose amplitude does not average to zero but varies with the audio signal. (C) A bypass capacitor is used to remove the radio frequency carrier pulses, leaving the audio signal

Circuit with detector bias battery (B1) to improve sensitivity and buzzer (BZ) to aid in adjustment of the cat whisker

The crystal detector demodulates the radio frequency signal, extracting the modulation (the audio signal which represents the sound waves) from the radio frequency carrier wave. In early receivers, a type of crystal detector often used was a "cat whisker detector". The point of contact between the wire and the crystal acted as a semiconductor diode. The cat whisker detector constituted a crude Schottky diode that allowed current to flow better in one direction than in the opposite direction. Modern crystal sets use modern semiconductor diodes. The crystal functions as an envelope detector, rectifying the alternating current radio signal to a pulsing direct current, the peaks of which trace out the audio signal, so it can be converted to sound by the earphone, which is connected to the detector. The rectified current from the detector has radio frequency pulses from the carrier frequency in it, which are blocked by the high inductive reactance and do not pass well through the coils of early date earphones. Hence, a small capacitor called a bypass capacitor is often placed across the earphone terminals; its low reactance at radio frequency bypasses these pulses around the earphone to ground. In some sets the earphone cord had enough capacitance that this component could be omitted.

Only certain sites on the crystal surface functioned as rectifying junctions, and the device was very sensitive to the pressure of the crystal-wire contact, which could be disrupted by the slightest vibration. Therefore, a usable contact point had to be found by trial and error before each use. The operator dragged the wire across the crystal surface until a radio station or "static" sounds were heard in the earphones. Alternatively, some radios (circuit, right) used a battery-powered buzzer attached to the input circuit to adjust the detector. The spark at the buzzer's electrical contacts served as a weak source of static, so when the detector began working, the buzzing could be heard in the earphones. The buzzer was then turned off, and the radio tuned to the desired station.

Galena (lead sulfide) was the most common crystal used, but various other types of crystals were also used, the most common being iron pyrite (fool's gold, FeS_{2}), silicon, molybdenite (MoS_{2}), silicon carbide (carborundum, SiC), and a zincite-bornite (ZnO-Cu_{5}FeS_{4}) crystal-to-crystal junction trade-named Perikon. Crystal radios have also been improvised from a variety of common objects, such as blue steel razor blades and lead pencils, rusty needles, and pennies In these, a semiconducting layer of oxide or sulfide on the metal surface is usually responsible for the rectifying action.

In modern sets, a semiconductor diode is used for the detector, which is much more reliable than a crystal detector and requires no adjustments. Germanium diodes (or sometimes Schottky diodes) are used instead of silicon diodes, because their lower forward voltage drop (roughly 0.3 V compared to 0.6 V) makes them more sensitive.

All semiconductor detectors function rather inefficiently in crystal receivers, because the low voltage input to the detector is too low to result in much difference between forward better conduction direction, and the reverse weaker conduction. To improve the sensitivity of some of the early crystal detectors, such as silicon carbide, a small forward bias voltage was applied across the detector by a battery and potentiometer. The bias moves the diode's operating point higher on the detection curve producing more signal voltage at the expense of less signal current (higher impedance). There is a limit to the benefit that this produces, depending on the other impedances of the radio. This improved sensitivity was caused by moving the DC operating point to a more desirable voltage-current operating point (impedance) on the junction's I-V curve. The battery did not power the radio, but only provided the biasing voltage which required little power.

=== Earphones ===
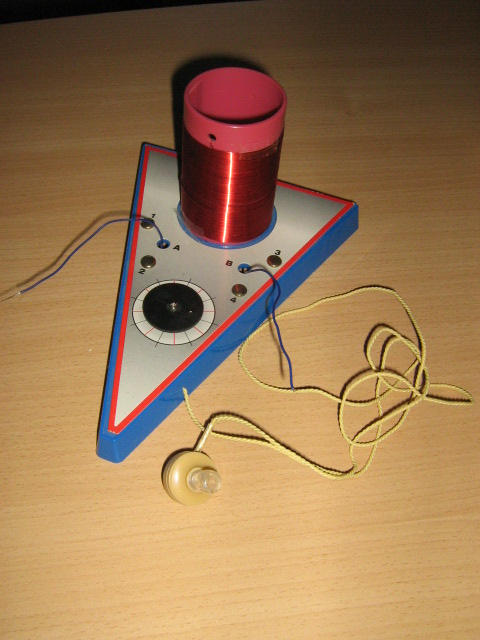
Modern crystal radio with piezoelectric earphone

The requirements for earphones used in crystal sets are different from earphones used with modern audio equipment. They have to be efficient at converting the electrical signal energy to sound waves, while most modern earphones sacrifice efficiency in order to gain high fidelity reproduction of the sound. In early homebuilt sets, the earphones were the most costly component.

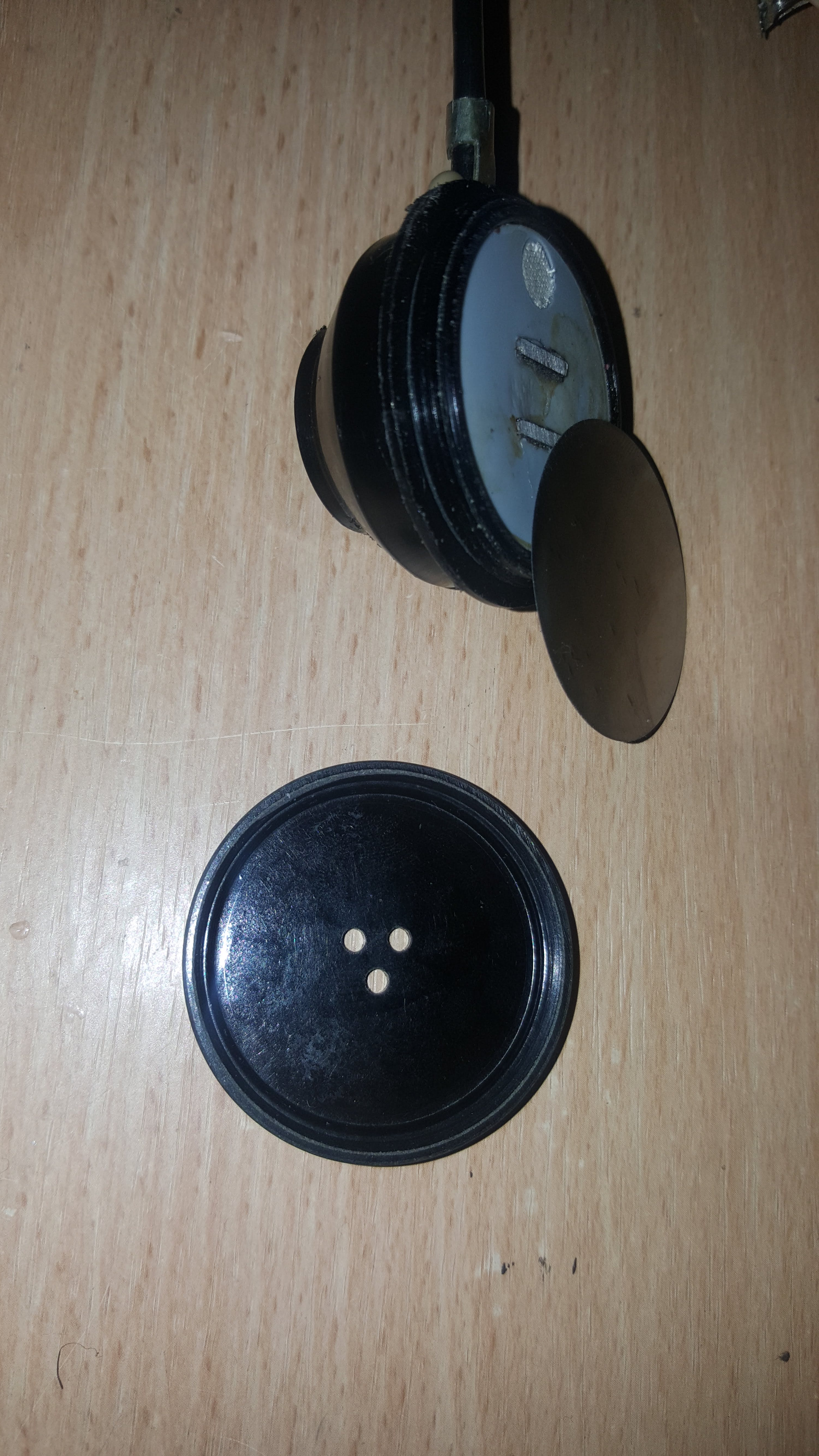
1600-ohm magnetic headset

The early earphones used with wireless-era crystal sets had moving iron drivers that worked in a way similar to the horn loudspeakers of the period. Each earpiece contained a permanent magnet about which was a coil of wire which formed a second electromagnet. Both magnetic poles were close to a steel diaphragm of the speaker. When the audio signal from the radio was passed through the electromagnet's windings, current was caused to flow in the coil which created a varying magnetic field that augmented or diminished that due to the permanent magnet. This varied the force of attraction on the diaphragm, causing it to vibrate. The vibrations of the diaphragm push and pull on the air in front of it, creating sound waves. Standard headphones used in telephone work had a low impedance, often 75 Ω, and required more current than a crystal radio could supply. Therefore, the type used with crystal set radios (and other sensitive equipment) was wound with more turns of finer wire giving it a high impedance of 2000–8000 Ω.

Modern crystal sets use piezoelectric crystal earpieces, which are much more sensitive and also smaller. They consist of a piezoelectric crystal with electrodes attached to each side, glued to a light diaphragm. When the audio signal from the radio set is applied to the electrodes, it causes the crystal to vibrate, vibrating the diaphragm. Crystal earphones are designed as ear buds that plug directly into the ear canal of the wearer, coupling the sound more efficiently to the eardrum. Their resistance is much higher (typically megohms) so they do not greatly "load" the tuned circuit, allowing increased selectivity of the receiver. The piezoelectric earphone's higher resistance, in parallel with its capacitance of around 9 pF, creates a filter that allows the passage of low frequencies, but blocks the higher frequencies. In that case a bypass capacitor is not needed (although in practice a small one of around 0.68 to 1 nF is often used to help improve quality), but instead a 10–100 kΩ resistor must be added in parallel with the earphone's input.

Although the low power produced by crystal radios is typically insufficient to drive a loudspeaker, some homemade 1960s sets have used one, with an audio transformer to match the low impedance of the speaker to the circuit. Similarly, modern low-impedance (8 Ω) earphones cannot be used unmodified in crystal sets because the receiver does not produce enough current to drive them. They are sometimes used by adding an audio transformer to match their impedance with the higher impedance of the driving antenna circuit.

== History ==
The first radio transmitters, used during the initial three decades of radio from 1887 to 1917, a period called the wireless telegraphy or radiotelegraphy era, were primitive spark transmitters which generated radio waves by discharging a capacitance through an electric spark. Each spark produced a transient pulse of radio waves which decreased rapidly to zero. These damped waves could not be modulated to carry sound, as in modern AM and FM transmission. So spark transmitters could not transmit sound, and instead transmitted information by radiotelegraphy. The transmitter was switched on and off rapidly by the operator using a telegraph key, creating different length pulses of damped radio waves ("dots" and "dashes") to spell out text messages in Morse code.

Therefore, the first radio receivers did not have to extract an audio signal from the radio wave like modern receivers, but just detected the presence of the radio wave, and produced a sound during the "dots" and "dashes" which were translated back to text by an operator who knew Morse code. The device which detected the radio signal was called a "detector". Since there were no amplifying devices at this time, the sensitivity of the receiver mostly depended on the detector and the antenna. The crystal detector was the most successful of many detector devices invented during this period.

=== Coherer receiver ===
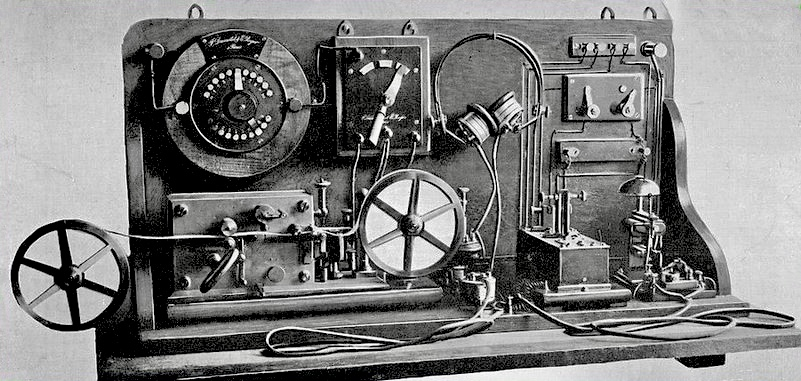
Commercial coherer receiver from around 1914

The crystal receiver developed from an earlier device, the first primitive radio receiver, called the coherer receiver. Guglielmo Marconi invented the first practical radiotelegraphy receivers and transmitters in 1894. Radio began to be used commercially around 1900. The detector used in the first receivers was a primitive device called a coherer, developed in 1890 by Édouard Branly and improved by Marconi and Oliver Lodge. Made in many forms, the most well known form consisted of a glass tube with electrodes at each end, containing loose metal filings in contact with the electrodes. Before a radio wave was applied, this device had a high electrical resistance, in the megohm range. When a radio wave from the antenna was applied across the electrodes it caused the filings to "cohere" or clump together and the coherer's resistance fell, causing a DC current from a battery to pass through it, which rang a bell or produced a mark on a paper tape representing the "dots" and "dashes" of Morse code. Most coherers had to be tapped mechanically between each pulse of radio waves to return them to a nonconductive state.

The coherer was a very poor detector, motivating much research to find better detectors. It worked by complicated thin film surface effects, so scientists of the time didn't understand how it worked, except for a vague idea that radio wave detection depended on some mysterious property of "imperfect" electrical contacts. Researchers investigating the effect of radio waves on various types of "imperfect" contacts to develop better coherers, invented crystal detectors.

=== Tuning ===
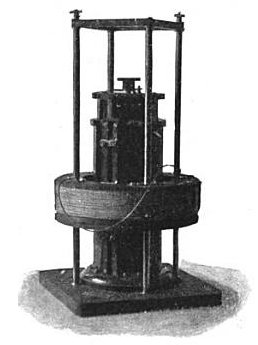
Braun receiving transformer from 1904

"Tuning" means adjusting the frequency of the receiver to the frequency of the desired radio transmission. The first receivers had no tuned circuit (resonant circuit), the detector was connected directly between the antenna and ground. Due to the lack of any frequency selective components besides the antenna, the bandwidth of the receiver, the band of frequencies it received, was equal to the broad bandwidth of the antenna. This was acceptable and even necessary because the first Hertzian spark transmitters also lacked a resonant circuit. Due to the impulsive nature of the spark, the energy of the radio waves was spread over a very wide band of frequencies. To receive enough energy from this wideband signal the receiver had to have a wide bandwidth also.

When more than one spark transmitter was transmitting in a given area, their frequencies overlapped, so their signals interfered with each other, resulting in garbled reception. Some method was needed to allow the receiver to select which transmitter's signal to receive. In 1892, William Crookes gave an influential lecture on radio in which he suggested using resonance, then called syntony, to reduce the bandwidth of transmitters and receivers. Different transmitters could then be "tuned" to transmit on different frequencies so they did not interfere. The receiver would also have a resonant circuit, and could receive a particular transmission by "tuning" its resonant circuit to the same frequency as the transmitter, analogously to tuning a musical instrument to resonance with another. This is the system used in all modern radio.

Between 1897 and 1900 the advantages of tuned systems, also called "syntonic" systems, became clear, and wireless researchers incorporated resonant circuits, consisting of capacitors and inductors connected together, into their transmitters and receivers. The resonant circuit acted like an electrical analog of a tuning fork. It had a high impedance at its resonant frequency, but a low impedance at all other frequencies. Connected between the antenna and the detector it served as a bandpass filter, passing the signal of the desired station to the detector, but routing all other signals to ground.

Oliver Lodge, who had been researching resonance for years patented the first tuned or "syntonic" transmitter and receiver on 10 May 1897 Although his circuit did not see much practical use, Lodge's "syntonic" patent was important because it was the first to propose a radio transmitter and receiver containing resonant circuits which were tuned to resonance with each other. In 1911 when the patent was renewed the Marconi Company was forced to buy it to protect its own syntonic system against infringement suits.

==== Inductive coupling and court case ====
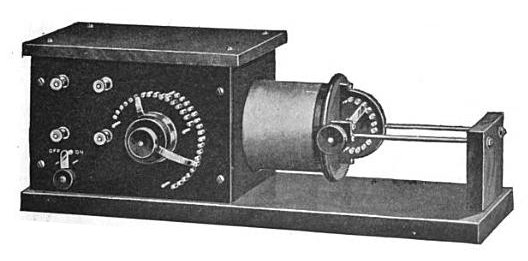
Navy "loose coupler" crystal radio tuning transformer. To tune the radio to different stations a separate variable tuning capacitor was adjusted. To adjust the impedance match the multiposition switches were changed. To increase the selectivity the secondary coil was slid further out of the primary coil in the box.

Wireless researchers found that a single resonant circuit used in transmitters and receivers did not have a narrow enough bandwidth to reduce interference between different stations adequately.

The solution which multiple researchers found was to use two resonant circuits in the transmitter and receiver, in the form of a double-tuned inductively-coupled circuit, or resonant transformer (oscillation transformer). In a receiver, the antenna and ground were connected to a coil of wire, which was magnetically coupled to a second coil with a capacitor across it, which was connected to the detector. The alternating current from the antenna through the primary coil created a magnetic field which induced a current in the secondary coil which fed the detector. Both primary and secondary were tuned circuits; the primary coil resonated with the capacitance of the antenna, while the secondary coil resonated with the capacitor across it. Both were adjusted to the same resonant frequency.

Similarly, two coupled resonant circuits were used in the spark transmitter. A radio communication system with two inductively coupled tuned circuits in the transmitter and two in the receiver, all four tuned to the same frequency, was called a "four circuit" system, and proved to be the key to practical radio communication.

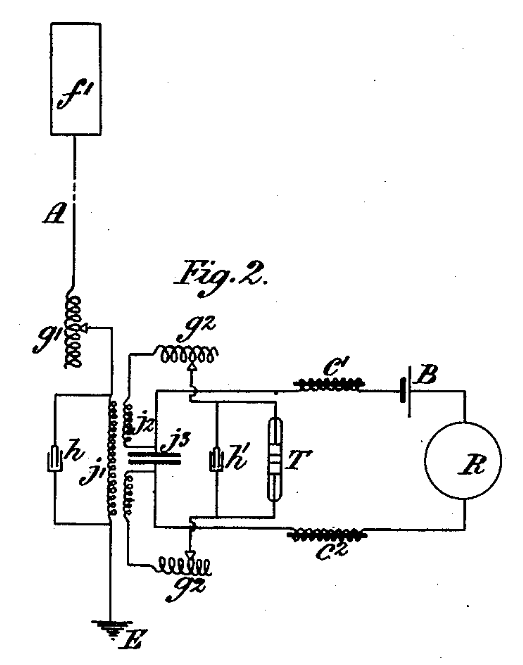
Marconi's inductively-coupled coherer receiver circuit from his April 1900 patent

The first person to use resonant circuits in a radio application was Nikola Tesla, who invented the resonant transformer in 1891. At a March 1893 St. Louis lecture he had demonstrated a wireless system that, although it was intended for wireless power transmission, had many of the elements of later radio communication systems. A grounded capacitance-loaded spark-excited resonant transformer (his Tesla coil) attached to an elevated wire monopole antenna transmitted radio waves, which were received across the room by a similar wire antenna attached to a receiver consisting of a second grounded resonant transformer tuned to the transmitter's frequency, which lighted a Geissler tube. This system, patented by Tesla 2 September 1897, 4 months after Lodge's "syntonic" patent, was in effect an inductively coupled radio transmitter and receiver, the first use of the "four circuit" system claimed by Marconi in his 1900 patent (below). However, Tesla was interested in wireless power and never developed a practical radio communication system. Other researchers applied the circuit to radio: inductively coupled radio systems were patented by Oliver Lodge in February 1898, Karl Ferdinand Braun in November 1899, and John Stone Stone in February 1900.

Marconi initially paid little attention to syntony, but later developed a radio system incorporating these improvements, calling his resonant transformer a "jigger". In spite of the above prior patents, Marconi in his 26 April 1900 "7777" patent claimed rights to the inductively coupled "four circuit" transmitter and receiver. Granted a British patent, the US patent office twice rejected Marconi's claim as lacking originality, but in a 1904 appeal a new patent commissioner reversed the decision and granted the patent. This patent gave Marconi a near monopoly of syntonic wireless telegraphy in England and America. Tesla sued Marconi's company for patent infringement but didn't have the resources to pursue the action.

Ferdinand Braun discovered the importance of loose coupling between the transformer coils in reducing the bandwidth. He and Marconi shared the 1909 Nobel prize in physics for "contributions to the development of wireless telegraphy".

In 1943 the US Supreme Court invalidated Marconi's patent on grounds of the prior patents of Tesla, Lodge, and Stone, but the decision did not specify who had rights to the four circuit wireless system. This came long after spark transmitters had become obsolete.

=== Invention of crystal detector ===
==== Braun's experiments ====
The "unilateral conduction" of crystals was discovered by Karl Ferdinand Braun, a German physicist, in 1874 at the University of Würzburg. He studied copper pyrite (Cu_{5}FeS_{4}), iron pyrite (iron sulfide, FeS_{2}), galena (PbS) and copper antimony sulfide (Cu_{3}SbS_{4}). This was before radio waves had been discovered, and Braun did not apply these devices practically but was interested in the nonlinear current–voltage characteristic that these sulfides exhibited. Braun's method of making contact with the crystal may have been crucial: he placed the sample on a circle of wire, then touched it with the end of a slender silver wire, a "cat's whisker" contact. Graphing the current as a function of voltage across a contact, he found the result was a line that was flat for current in one direction but curved upward for current in the other direction, instead of a straight line, showing that these substances did not obey Ohm's law. They conducted current much better in one direction than the other.

==== Bose's experiments ====
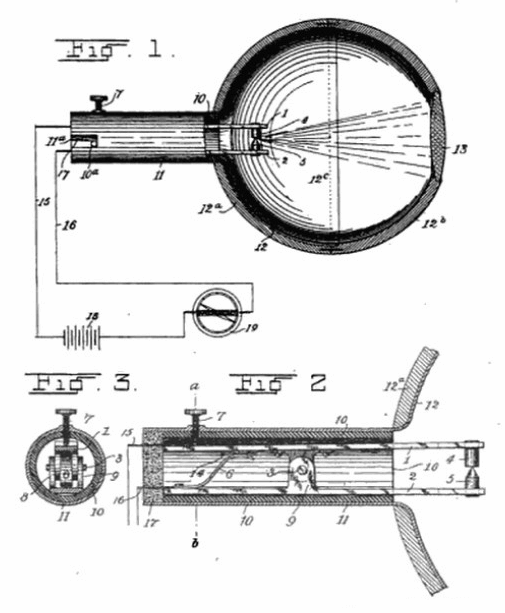
Bose's galena detector from his 1901 patent. This version was deliberately made to look and function like a human eyeball, with a lens focusing millimeter waves on the galena contact.

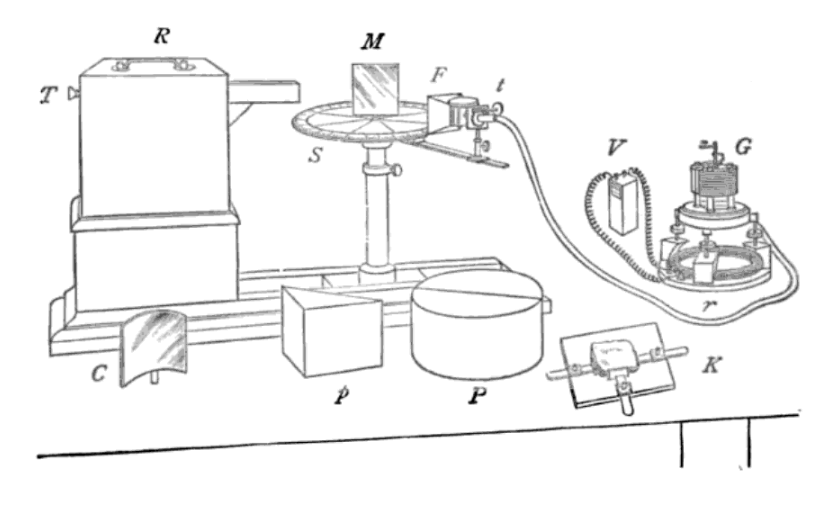
Bose's millimeter wave spectrometer, 1897. The spark transmitter is inside the box (R). The galena detector is inside the horn antenna (F) with a thumbscrew (t) which adjusted the pressure of a metal point against the crystal. The battery (V) creates a current through the detector measured by the galvanometer (G)

Jagadish Chandra Bose first used crystals for radio wave detection, in his experiments with microwaves at the University of Calcutta from 1894 to 1900. Like other scientists since Hertz, Bose was investigating the similarity between radio waves and light by duplicating classic optics experiments with radio waves. For a receiver he first used a coherer consisting of a steel spring pressing against a metal surface with a current passing through it. Dissatisfied with this detector, around 1897 Bose measured the change in resistivity of dozens of metals and metal compounds exposed to microwaves. He experimented with many substances as contact detectors, focusing on galena.

His detectors consisted of a small galena crystal with a metal point contact pressed against it with a thumbscrew, mounted inside a closed waveguide ending in a horn antenna to collect the microwaves. Bose passed a current from a battery through the crystal, and used a galvanometer to measure it. When microwaves struck the crystal the galvanometer registered a drop in resistance of the detector. Thomas Lee has argued that this detector functioned by the semiconductor's change in resistance with temperature, as a bolometer, not a rectifying detector. At the time scientists thought that radio wave detectors functioned by some mechanism analogous to the way the eye detected light, and Bose found his detector was also sensitive to visible light and ultraviolet, leading him to call it an artificial retina. Bose's semiconductor galena detector is considered the forerunner of the semiconductor diode, He patented the detector 30 September 1901 and this is often considered the first patent on a semiconductor device.

==== Pickard: discovery of rectification ====
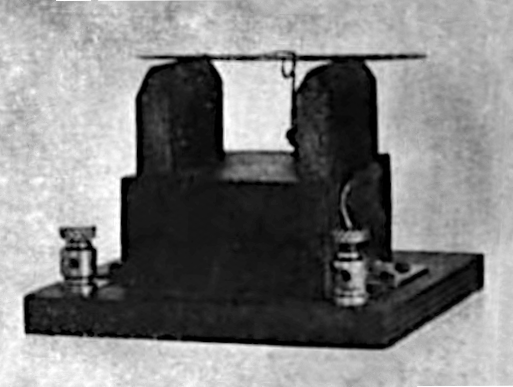
"Microphone" coherer detector from 1909 similar to one Pickard discovered rectification with, widely used in the first receivers. It consists of a steel needle resting on two carbon blocks. A semiconducting layer of corrosion on the steel may have been responsible for the rectification.

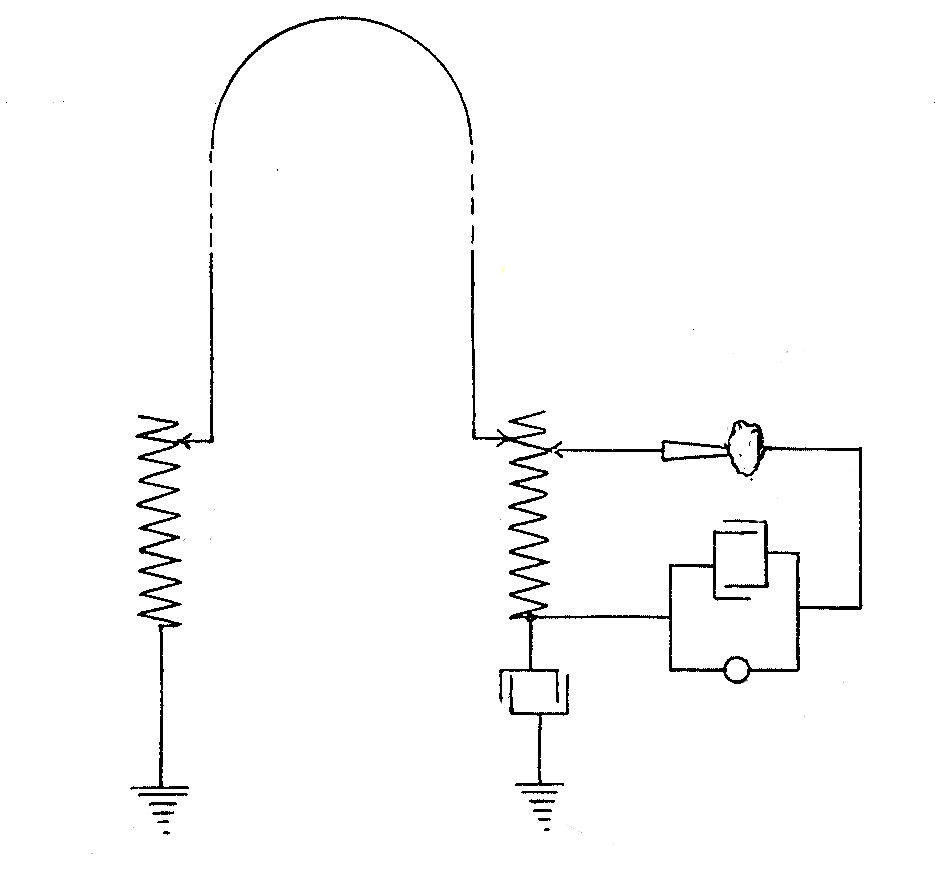
Pickard's circuit diagram of a crystal receiver in his U.S. patent 836,531, Means for Receiving Intelligence Communicated by Electric Waves, filed: 30 August 1906, granted: 20 November 1906

Greenleaf Whittier Pickard, an engineer with the American Wireless Telephone and Telegraph Co. invented the rectifying contact detector, discovering rectification of radio waves in 1902 while experimenting with a coherer detector consisting of a steel needle resting across two carbon blocks. On 29 May 1902 he was operating this device, listening to a radiotelegraphy station. Coherers required an external current source to operate, so he had the coherer and telephone earphone connected in series with a 3 cell battery to provide power to operate the earphone. Annoyed by background "frying" noise caused by the current through the carbon, he reached over to cut two of the battery cells out of the circuit to reduce the current

The frying ceased, and the signals, though much weakened, became materially clearer through being freed of their background of microphonic noise. Glancing over at my circuit, I discovered to my great surprise that instead of cutting out two of the cells I had cut out all three; so, therefore, the telephone diaphragm was being operated solely by the energy of the receiver signals. A contact detector operating without local battery seemed so contrary to all my previous experience that ... I resolved at once to thoroughly investigate the phenomenon.

The generation of an audio signal without a DC bias battery made Pickard realize the device was acting as a rectifier. Pickard began to experiment and found an oxidized steel surface worked better, so he tried magnetite (Fe_{3}O_{4}). On 16 October 1902 he received a radio station using magnetite touched by a copper wire, which he said was the first crystal detector.

During the next seven years, Pickard conducted an exhaustive search to find which substances formed the most sensitive detecting contacts, eventually testing thousands of minerals, and discovered about 250 rectifying crystals. In 1906 he obtained a sample of fused silicon, an artificial product recently synthesized in electric furnaces, and it outperformed all other substances. He patented the silicon detector 30 August 1906. In 1907 he formed a company to manufacture his detectors, Wireless Specialty Products Co., and the silicon detector was the first crystal detector to be sold commercially. Pickard went on to produce other detectors using the crystals he had discovered; the more popular being the iron pyrite "Pyron" detector and the zincite–chalcopyrite crystal-to-crystal "Perikon" detector in 1908, which stood for "PERfect pIcKard cONtact".

==== Crystal detectors become popular ====
Around 1906 wireless researchers recognised that mineral crystals could be a better detector than the coherer, crystal radios began to be made, and many new crystal detectors were invented. Part of the reason for this increased interest was that commercial coherer receivers had switched from using paper tape recorders (siphon recorders) as an output device, which were incompatible with crystal detectors, to earphones, which could use the crystal's output current.

On 23 March 1906 Henry Harrison Chase Dunwoody, a retired general in the U.S. Army Signal Corps, patented the silicon carbide (carborundum) detector, using another recent product of electric furnaces. The semiconductor silicon carbide has a wide band gap and Pickard discovered the detector's sensitivity could be increased by applying a forward bias, a DC potential of around a volt from a battery and potentiometer, to it.

Braun around 1899 began to experiment with crystals as radio detectors and in 1906 patented a galena cat whisker detector in Germany. In 1906 L. W. Austin invented a silicon–tellurium detector, in 1907 Pickard invented the molybdenite detector, and in 1911 Thompson H. Lyon invented the cerussite detector. In 1908 Wichi Torikata at Tokyo Imperial University investigated 200 minerals and found cassiterite (tin oxide), pyrolusite (manganese dioxide), zincite, galena, and pyrite were sensitive, and subsequently tested all the mineral samples at the Mineral College and found 34 rectifying minerals.

=== Use during the radiotelegraphy era ===
During the radiotelegraphy era, from the beginning of radio in 1894 to 1920, there was virtually no broadcasting; radio was used as a person-to-person text messaging service. For the first 10 years coherers and electrolytic detectors were used in receivers. Long-distance radio communication depended on high power transmitters (up to 1 megawatt), huge wire antennas, and a receiver with a sensitive detector.

Around 1907 crystal detectors replaced the coherer and electrolytic detector in receivers to become the most widely used form of radio detector. Until the triode vacuum tube began to be used in World War I, crystals were the best radio reception technology, used in cutting-edge receivers in wireless telegraphy stations, as well as in homemade crystal radios.

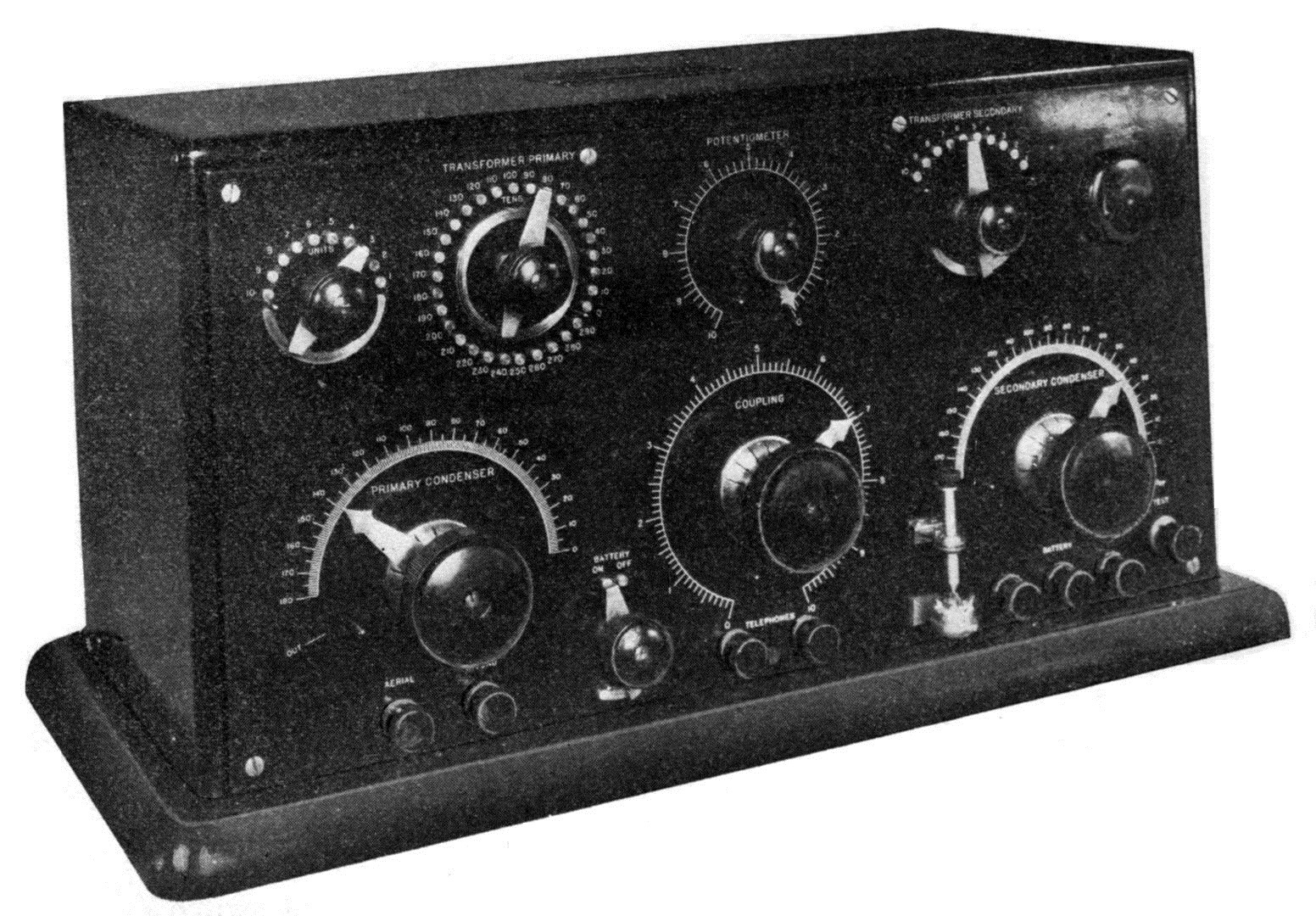
Marconi Type 106 crystal receiver used for transatlantic communication, c. 1917

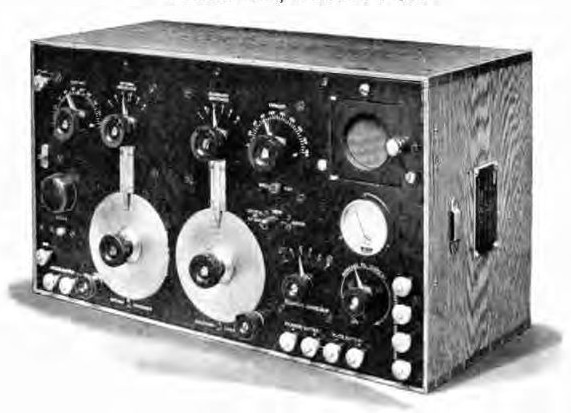
Wireless Specialty Products type IP-501 naval crystal/audion receiver widely used in World War 1

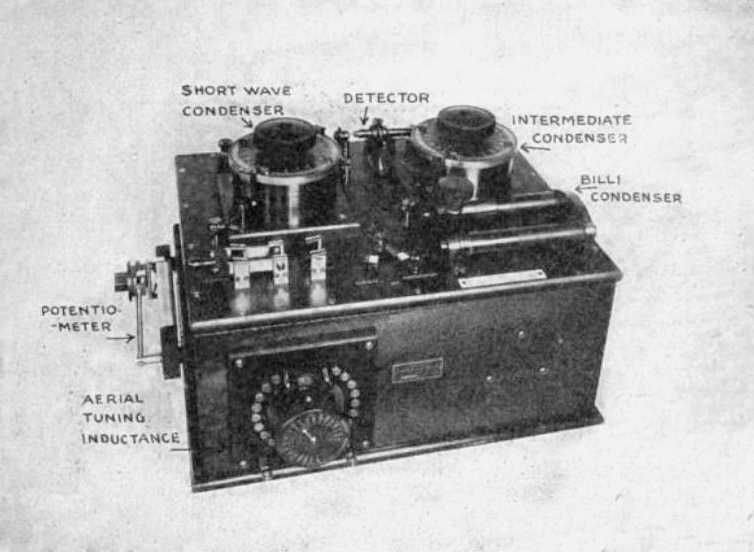
Marconi Type 103 shipboard crystal set with parts labeled

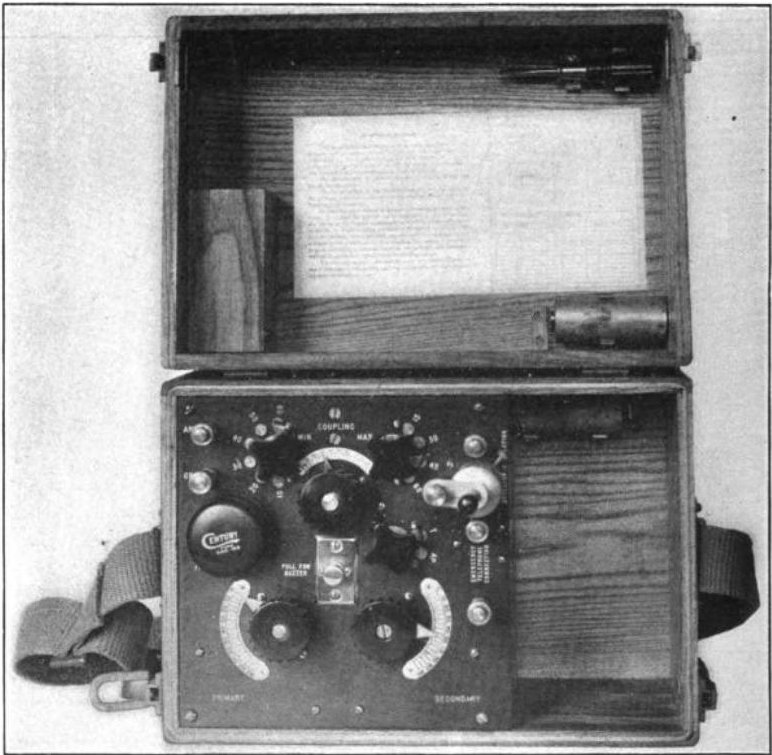
SCR-54-A portable crystal set used by US Signal Corps in World War I

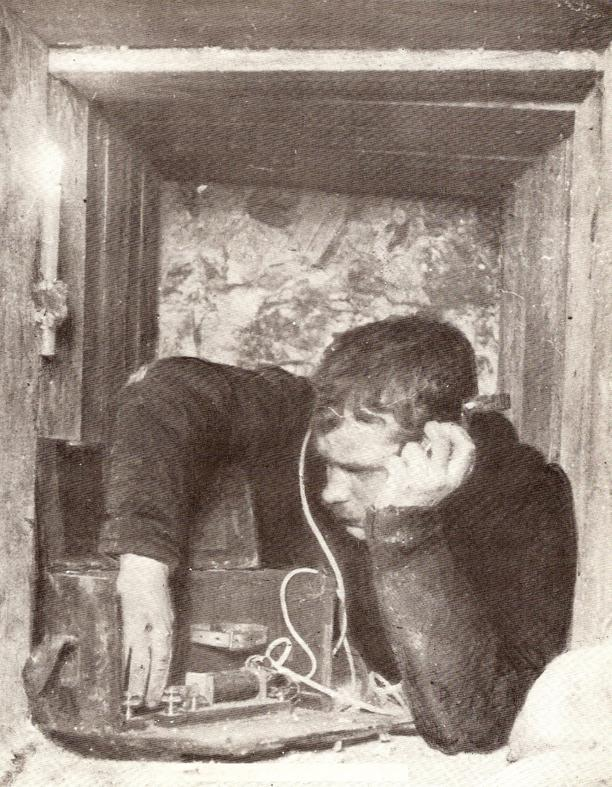
Soldier listening to a crystal radio during World War I, 1914

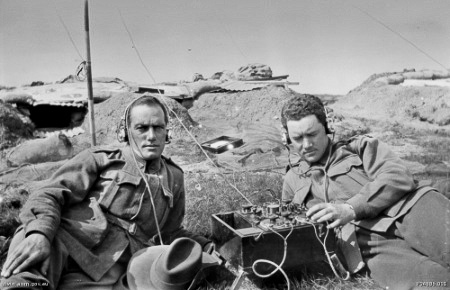
Australian signallers using a Marconi Mk III crystal receiver, 1916

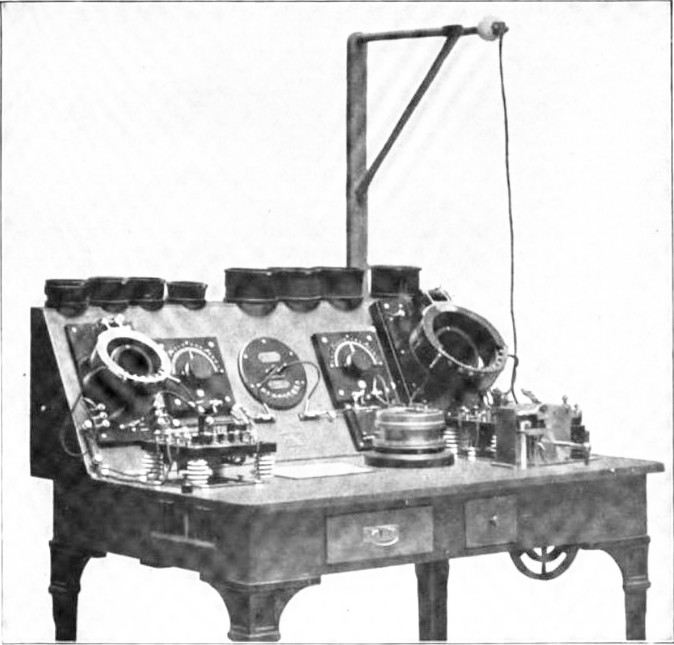
A crystal receiver used in long distance Telefunken radiotelegraphy stations

Wireless telegraphy companies such as Marconi and Telefunken manufactured sophisticated inductively coupled crystal radios as communication receivers in ship radio rooms and shore stations. Military versions were made for naval warships and military communication stations. Lightweight crystal radios such as the SCR-54 were part of portable radiotelegraphy stations carried by army troops in World War 1 to communicate with their commanders behind the lines. After the war, electronics firms produced inexpensive "box" crystal radios for consumers. Many radio amateurs worldwide built their own crystal sets, following instructions in radio magazines.

Galena (lead sulfide, PbS, sometimes sold under the names "Lenzite" and "Hertzite"), was the most widely used crystal detector since it was the most sensitive. Other common crystalline minerals used were iron pyrite (iron sulfide, FeS_{2}, "fool's gold", also sold under the trade names "Pyron", "Ferron" and "Radiocite"), molybdenite (molybdenum disulfide, MoS_{2}), and cerussite (lead carbonate, PbCO_{3}). A disadvantage of these detectors was they required a delicate wire "cat whisker" contact, which could be disrupted by the slightest vibration. So they had to be readjusted before each use, the tip of the wire dragged across the surface of the crystal while the user listened for radio noise in the earphones, to find an active rectifying site. Another widely used type was Pickard's "Perikon" detector, consisting of zincite and chalcopyrite crystals touching.

Much research went into finding better detectors and many types of crystals were tried. The goal of researchers was to find rectifying crystals that were less fragile and sensitive to vibration than galena and the other cat-whisker detectors above. Another desired property was tolerance of high currents; many crystals would become insensitive when subjected to discharges of atmospheric electricity from the outdoor wire antenna, or current from the powerful spark transmitter leaking into the receiver. Carborundum proved to be the best of these; it could rectify with a steel point pressed firmly against it with a spring, or even clamped between two flat contacts, so carborundum contacts didn't need to be adjusted before each use like the delicate cat whisker types. Therefore, carborundum detectors were used in shipboard wireless stations where waves caused the floor to rock, and military stations where gunfire was expected. Silicon detectors, although less sturdy than carborundum, also used a spring-loaded point contact which could not be jarred loose, so they were also used in professional and military stations.

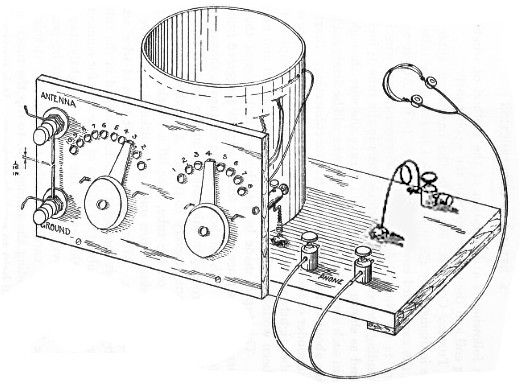
US Bureau of Standards 1922 Circular 120 "Construction and Operation of a Simple Homemade Radio Receiving Outfit" taught the American public how to build a crystal radio.

Between about 1904 and 1915 the first types of radio transmitters were developed which produced continuous sinusoidal waves: the arc converter (Poulsen arc) and the Alexanderson alternator. These slowly replaced the old damped wave spark transmitters. Besides having a longer transmission range, these transmitters could be modulated with an audio signal to transmit sound by amplitude modulation (AM) radiotelephony. Unlike the coherer, the rectifying action of the crystal detector allowed it to demodulate an AM radio signal, producing audio (sound). Although other detectors used at the time, the electrolytic detector, Fleming valve and the triode could also rectify AM signals, crystals were the simplest, cheapest AM detector.

During World War I the triode vacuum tube, the first practical amplifier, was developed into a reliable component, and commercial and military wireless stations switched from crystal receivers to more sensitive vacuum tube receivers. However the popularity and sales of crystal radios continued to increase for a few years due to the sudden rise of radio broadcasting. After World War I, radio stations began experimenting with transmitting sound, voice and music, by amplitude modulation (AM), and a growing community of radio listeners built or bought crystal radios to listen to them. In 1922 the United States Bureau of Standards (now NIST), responding to consumer interest, released a publication entitled Construction and Operation of a Simple Homemade Radio Receiving Outfit. This article (see drawing) showed how anyone who was handy with simple tools could make a crystal radio and tune into weather, crop prices, time, news and the opera.

Use of crystal radios continued to grow until the 1920s when vacuum tube radios replaced them.

==== Intensifiers ====
Crystal receivers were even used for transatlantic communication. In transoceanic radiotelegraphy stations specialized sensitive inductively coupled crystal receivers fed by mile long wire antennas were used to receive Morse code telegram traffic and record it on paper tape. This distance was at the extreme edge of a crystal receiver's reception range. Before amplifying vacuum tubes became available, wireless companies tried to develop technology to make the received signal stronger.

One solution was the "intensifier"; such as the version invented by S. G. Brown Co. and used by the Marconi Co. The output current of the crystal receiver was passed through a winding on the pole pieces of a permanent magnet. Mounted close to the magnet poles was a steel resonant reed. The reed was adjusted to resonate at the audio spark frequency of the transmitter. When the reed vibrated, switch contacts on the reed periodically closed a battery circuit with an earphone, creating a buzzing sound in the earphone. Due to resonance, signals that were too weak to be heard directly excited large vibrations in the reed, allowing them to be detected.

==== Crystodyne ====
Some semiconductor junctions have a property called negative resistance which means the current through them decreases as the voltage increases over a part of their I–V curve. This allows a diode, normally a passive device, to function as an amplifier or oscillator. For example, when connected to a resonant circuit and biased with a DC voltage, the negative resistance of the diode can cancel the positive resistance of the circuit, creating a circuit with zero AC resistance, in which spontaneous oscillating currents arise. This property was first observed in crystal detectors around 1909 by William Henry Eccles and Pickard. They noticed that when their detectors were biased with a DC voltage to improve their sensitivity, they would sometimes break into spontaneous oscillations. However these researchers just published brief accounts and did not pursue the effect.

The first person to exploit negative resistance practically was self-taught Russian physicist Oleg Losev, who devoted his career to the study of crystal detectors. In 1922 working at the new Nizhny Novgorod Radio Laboratory he discovered negative resistance in biased zincite (zinc oxide) point contact junctions. He realized that amplifying crystals could be an alternative to the fragile, expensive, energy-wasting vacuum tube. He used biased negative resistance crystal junctions to build solid-state amplifiers, oscillators, and amplifying and regenerative radio receivers, 25 years before the invention of the transistor. However his achievements were overlooked because of the success of vacuum tubes. His technology was dubbed "Crystodyne" by science publisher Hugo Gernsback one of the few people in the West who paid attention to it. After ten years he abandoned research into this technology and it was forgotten.

=== Use during the broadcast era ===
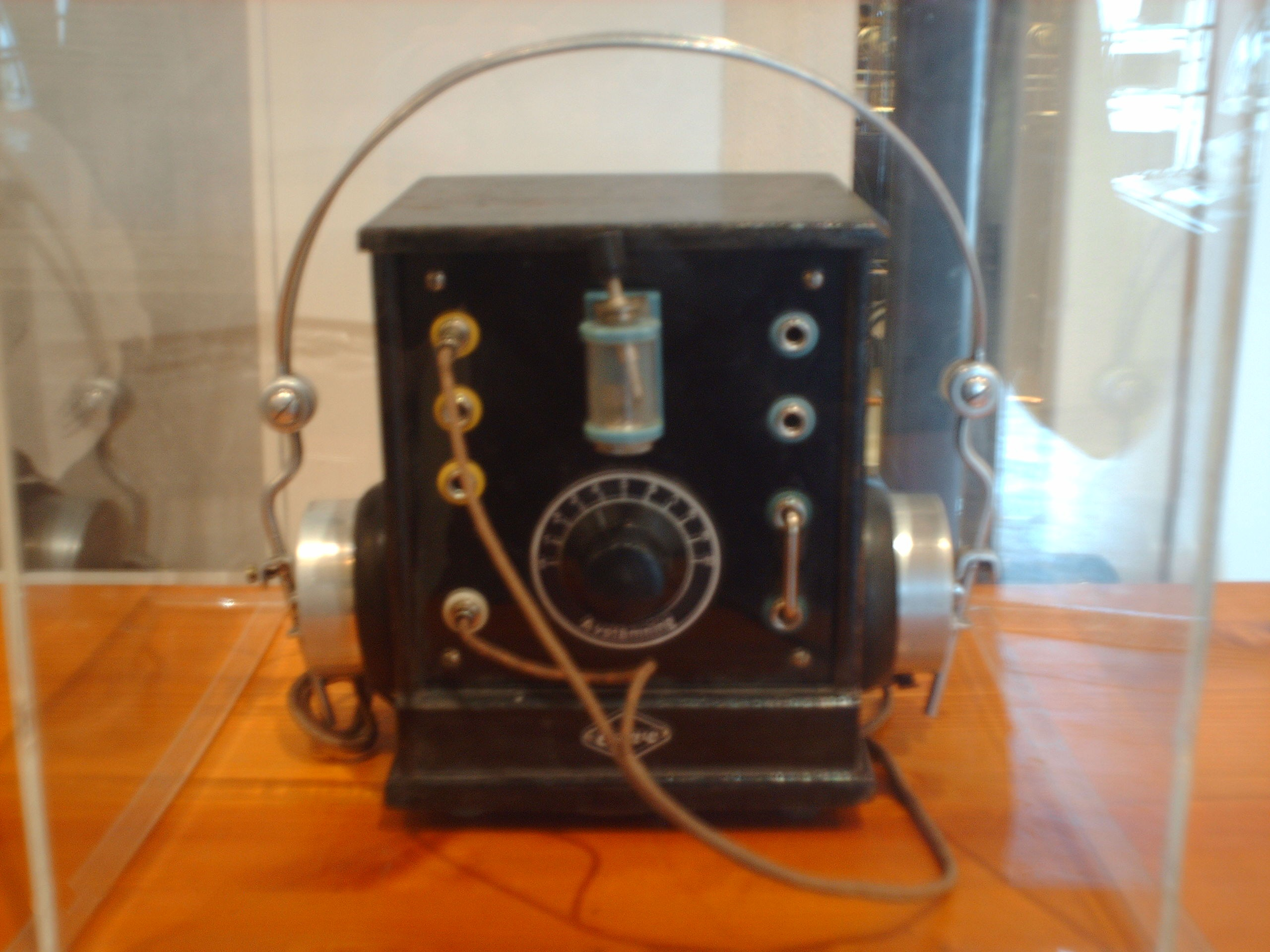
Swedish "box" crystal radio with earphones, c. 1925

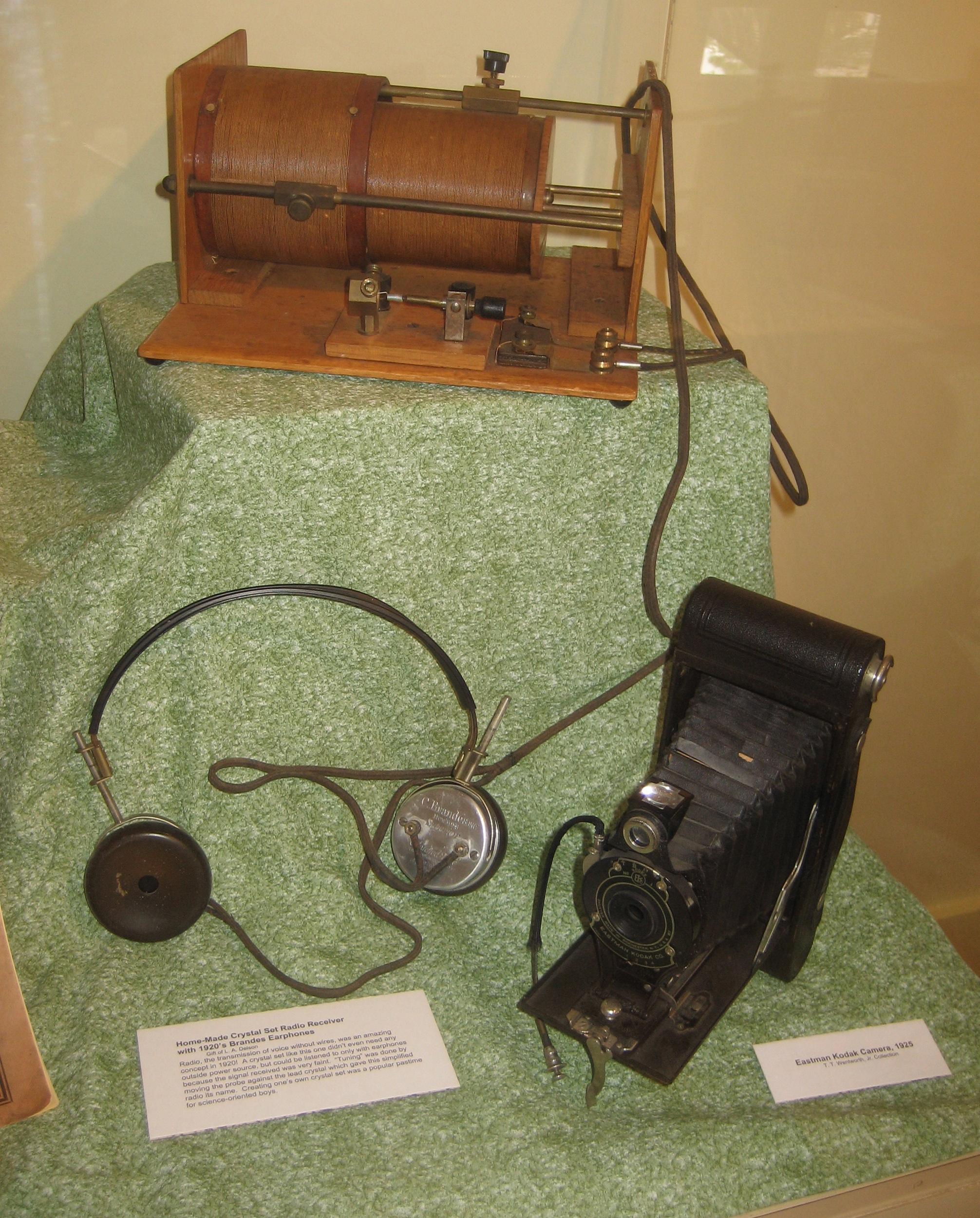
Homemade "loose coupler" set (top), museum in Florida, c. 1920

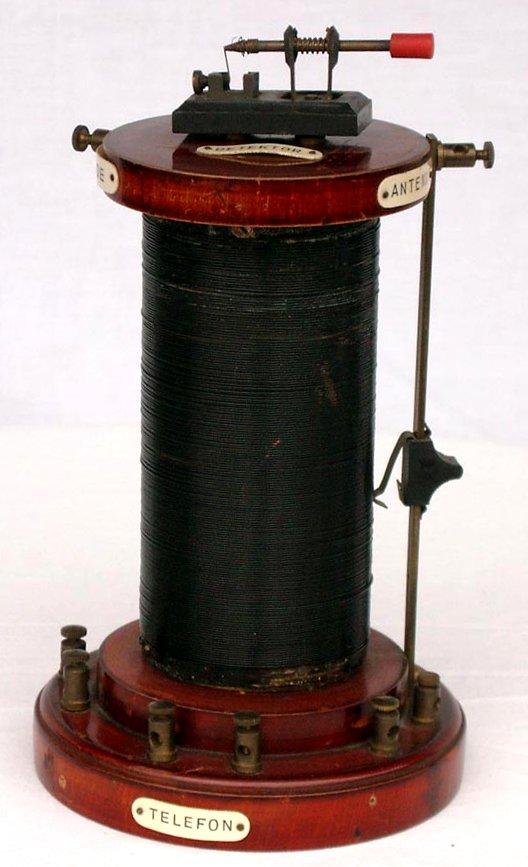
Crystal radio, Germany, c. 1924

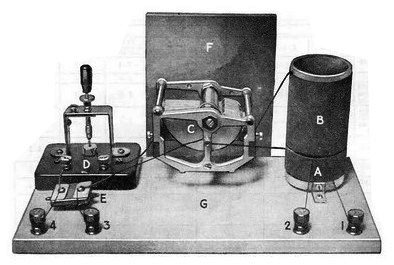
DIY crystal radio from a 1925 article in Popular Science magazine

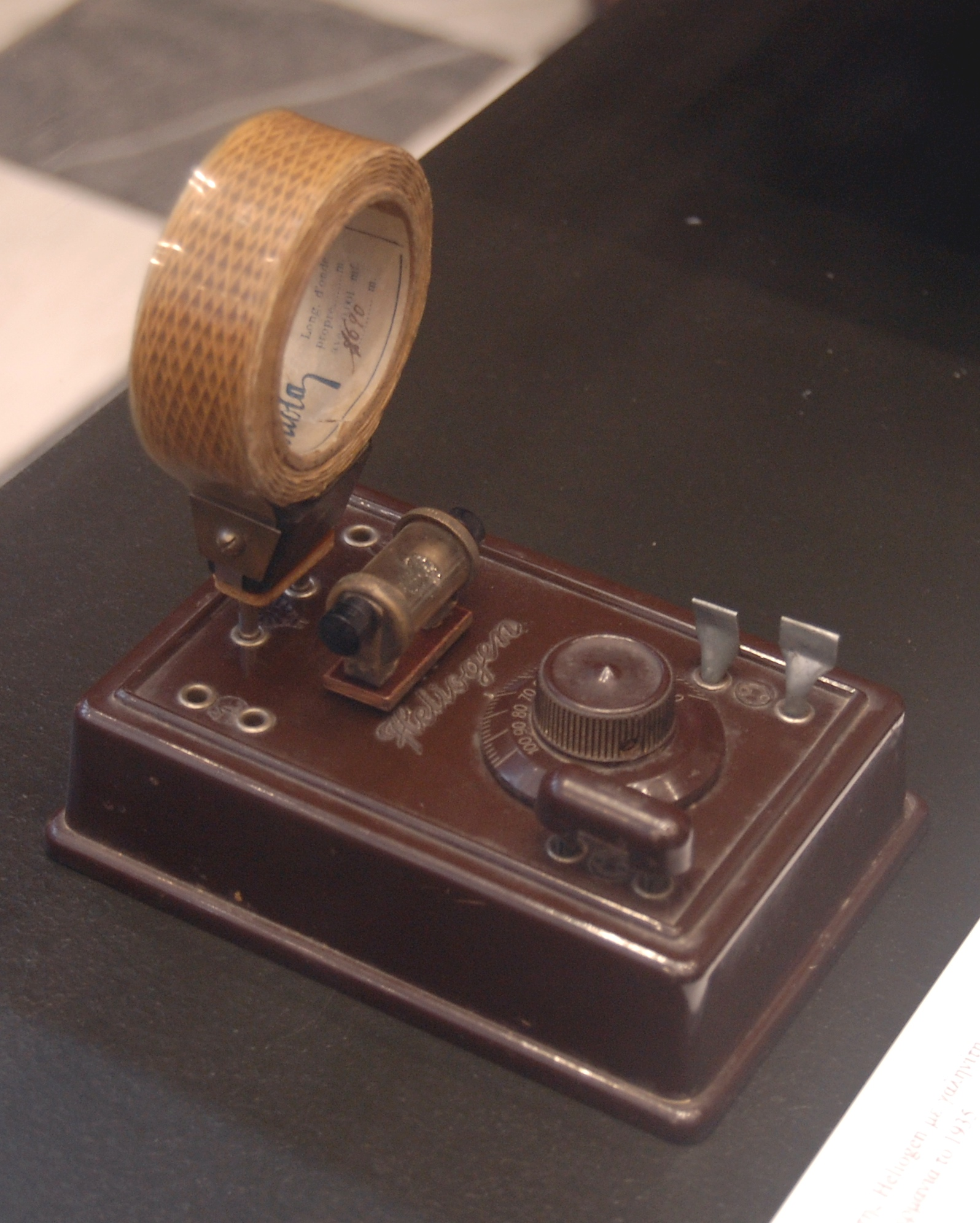
German Heliogen brand radio using a "basket-weave" coil, 1935

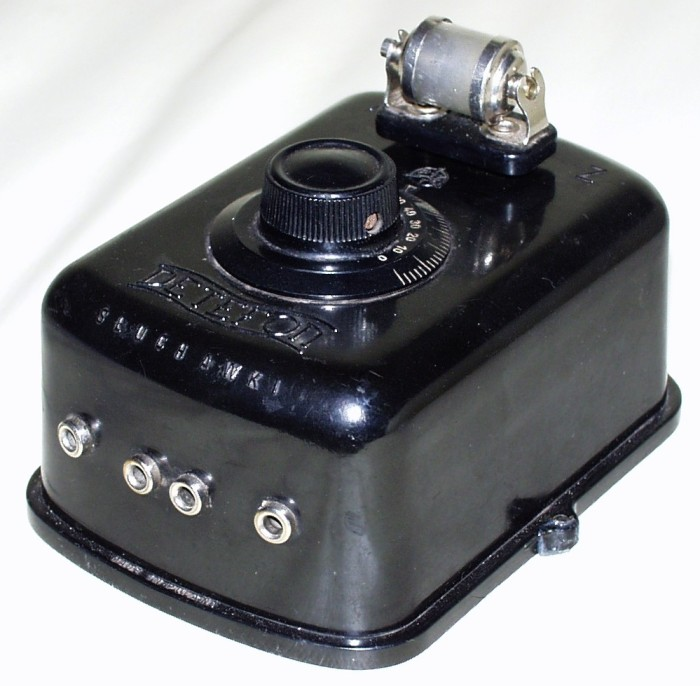
Polish Detefon brand radio, 1930–1939, using a "cartridge" type crystal (top)

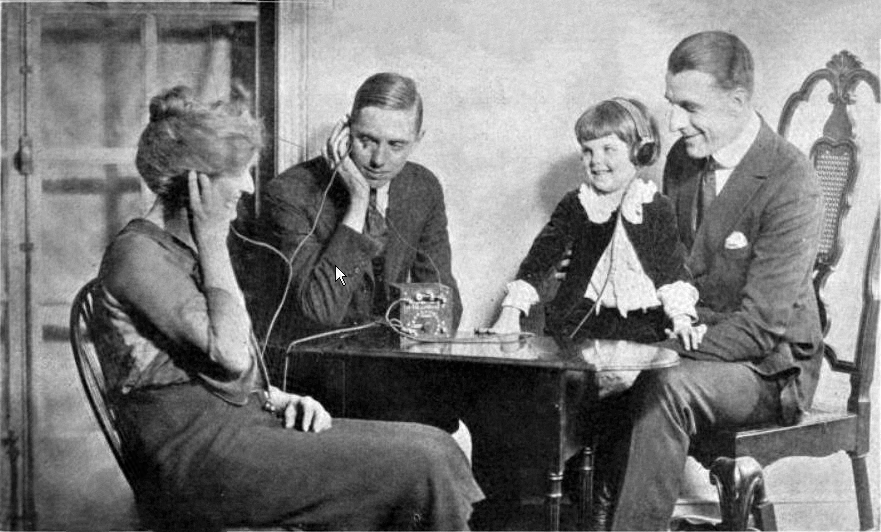
Family listening to the first radio broadcasts on a crystal radio in 1922. Since crystal radios cannot drive loudspeakers they must share earphones.

In the 1920s, the amplifying triode vacuum tube, invented in 1907 by Lee De Forest, replaced earlier technology in both radio transmitters and receivers. AM radio broadcasting spontaneously arose around 1920, and radio listening exploded from a solitary hobby to become a hugely popular public pastime. The initial listening audience for the new broadcasting stations was largely owners of crystal radios, as many consumers could not afford the new tube radios. But lacking amplification, crystal radios had to be listened to with earphones, and could only receive nearby stations within about 25 – 50 miles. The amplifying vacuum tube radios which began to be mass-produced in 1921 had greater reception range, did not require the fussy adjustment of a cat whisker, and produced enough audio output power to drive loudspeakers, allowing the entire family to listen comfortably together, or dance to Jazz Age music.

So during the 1920s vacuum tube receivers replaced crystal radios in all except poor households. The temperamental, unreliable action of the crystal detector had always been a barrier to its acceptance as a standard component in commercial radio equipment and was one reason for its rapid replacement. Frederick Seitz, an early semiconductor researcher, wrote:

Such variability, bordering on what seemed the mystical, plagued the early history of crystal detectors and caused many of the vacuum tube experts of a later generation to regard the art of crystal rectification as being close to disreputable.

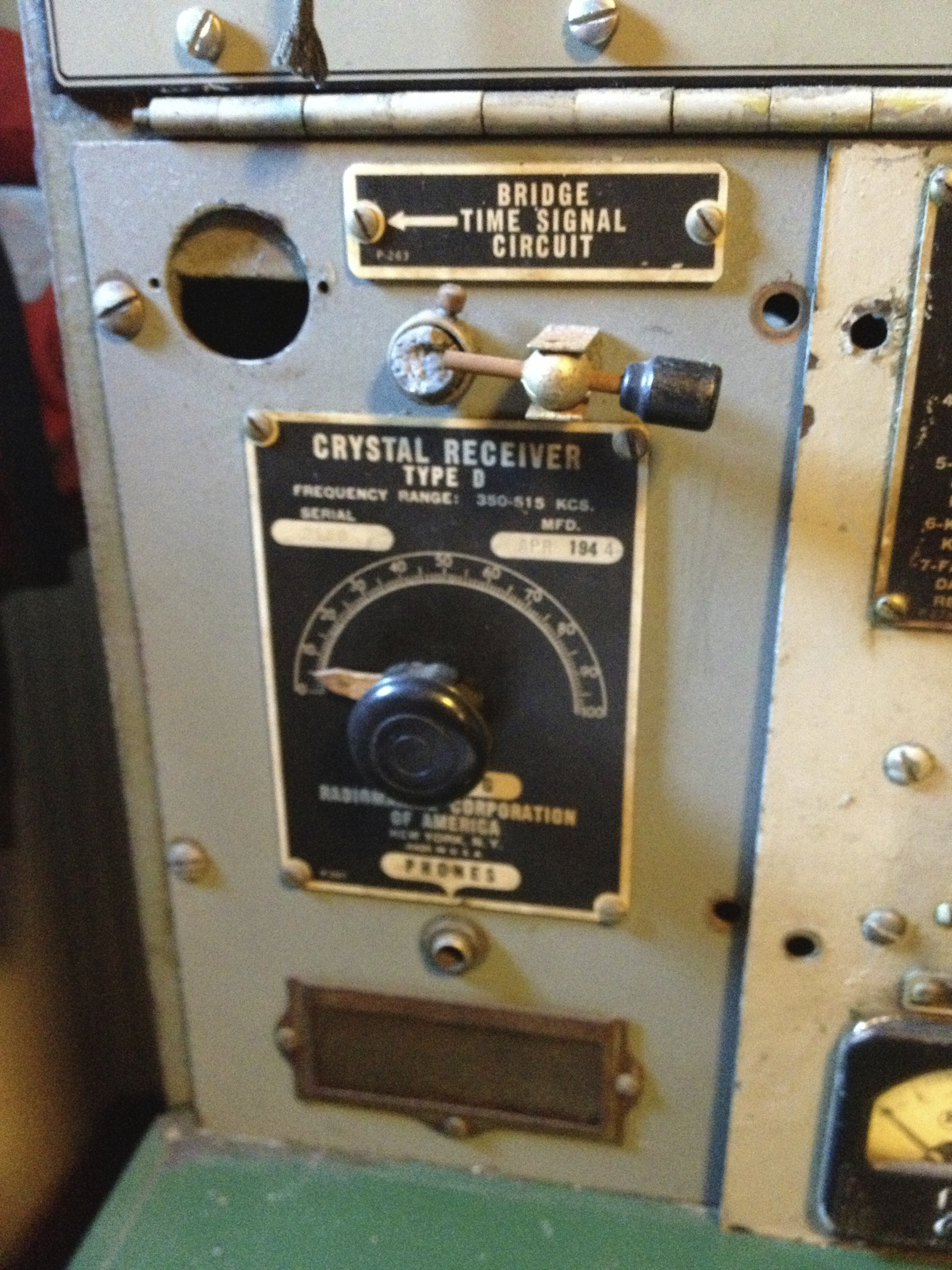
Crystal radio used as a backup receiver on a World War II Liberty ship

The crystal radio became a cheap alternative receiver used for emergency communication and by people who could not afford tube radios: teenagers, the poor, and those in developing countries. Building a crystal set remained a popular educational project to introduce people to radio, used by organizations like the Boy Scouts. The galena detector, the most widely used type among amateurs, became virtually the only detector used in crystal radios from this point on. Crystal radios were kept as emergency backup radios on ships. During World War II in Nazi-occupied Europe the radio saw use as an easily constructed, easily concealed clandestine radio by Resistance groups.

==== "Foxhole radios" ====
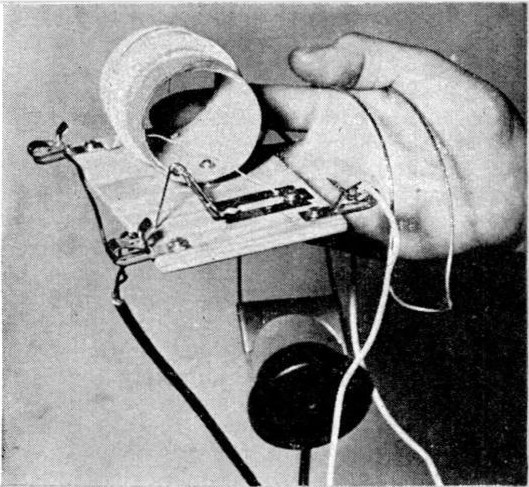
"Foxhole radio" used on the Italian Front in World War 2. It uses a pencil lead attached to a safety pin pressing against a razor blade for a detector.

In addition to mineral crystals, the oxide coatings of many metal surfaces act as semiconductors (detectors) capable of rectification. Crystal radios have been improvised using detectors made from rusty nails, corroded pennies, and many other common objects.

In World War II, when Allied troops were halted near Anzio, Italy during the spring of 1944, powered personal radio receivers were strictly prohibited as the Germans had equipment that could detect the local oscillator signal of superheterodyne receivers. Crystal sets lack power driven local oscillators, hence they could not be detected. Some resourceful soldiers constructed "crystal" sets from discarded materials to listen to news and music. One type used a blue steel razor blade and a pencil lead for a detector. The lead point touching the semiconducting oxide coating (magnetite) on the blade formed a crude point-contact diode. By carefully adjusting the pencil lead on the surface of the blade, they could find spots capable of rectification. The sets were dubbed "foxhole radios" by the popular press, and they became part of the folklore of World War II.

In some German-occupied countries during WW2 there were widespread confiscations of radio sets from the civilian population. This led determined listeners to build their own clandestine receivers which often amounted to little more than a basic crystal set. Anyone doing so risked imprisonment or even death if caught, and in most of Europe the signals from the BBC (or other allied stations) were not strong enough to be received on such a set.

=== Post World War II to present ===
After World War II, the development of modern semiconductor diodes finally made the galena cat whisker detector obsolete. In the few crystal radios still being made, the cat whisker detector was replaced by a germanium diode, invented during the war, which didn't require adjustment. The germanium diode was used because it was a more sensitive detector than the silicon diode due to its lower forward voltage (0.3V versus 0.7V).

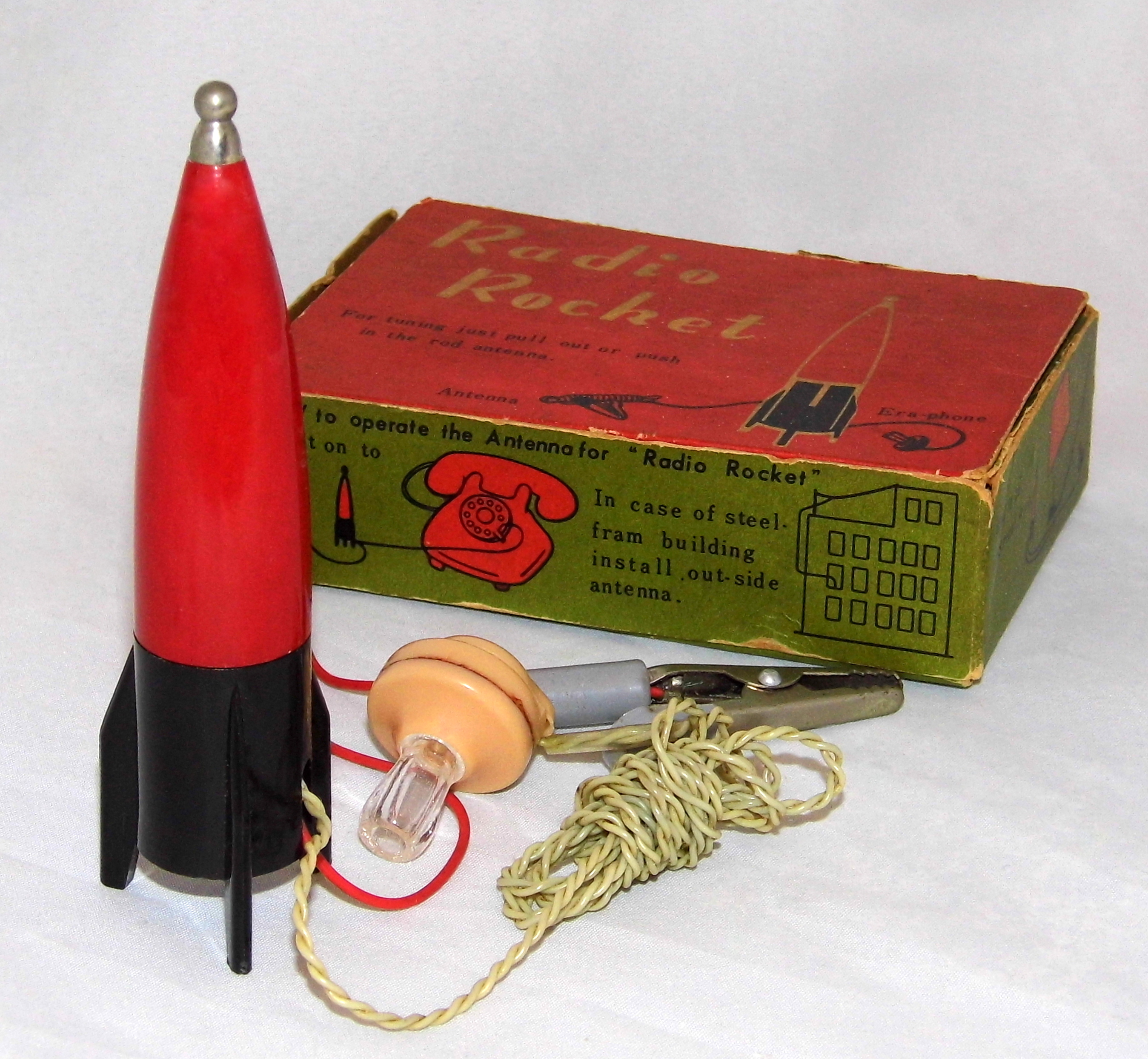
Novelty crystal radio, made in Japan, 1950s

The transistor radio introduced in 1954 took over the crystal radio's market niche of a cheap portable radio. So during the 1950s to 1970s the only remaining market for crystal radios was as a scientific educational novelty toy for children.

In the late 1950s, a variety of cheap novelty crystal radios in plastic cases, typically imported from Japan, were sold as educational toys. One was the "rocket radio", shaped like a rocket (see picture) For a detector they used a sealed germanium diode which did not need adjustment like the cat's whisker detector. As an audio output device they used a piezoelectric crystal earpiece, which was far more efficient than dynamic earphones, and also did not load the tuned circuit, reducing the Q factor of the tuned circuit and thus the selectivity of the receiver, as dynamic earphones did. For a tuning coil they used a ferrite core loop antenna, which was more compact than the previous air core coils, also functioned as an antenna, and eliminated the need for a ground connection. The radio is tuned to different stations by moving the ferrite core in and out of the coil, changing the magnetic permeability and thus the inductance of the coil. The reception range of these simple radios was limited to strong local AM radio stations within 15–25 miles. They usually had an alligator clip which could be clipped to an external wire antenna, to increase the range.

The Boy Scouts have continued to include the educational construction of a crystal radio in their program since the 1920s.

Recently, communities of hobbyists have started building classically designed long-distance crystal receivers similar to those from the radiotelegraphy era. Much effort goes into the visual appearance of these sets as well as their performance. Annual crystal radio 'DX' contests (long distance reception) and building contests allow these set owners to compete with each other.

== Use as a power source ==
There is a history of experimental designs of transistorized "free-power" crystal radios which use power harvested from the received signal, or ambient radio noise, to amplify the output. With a strong local radio station and a good antenna, a transistor amplifier can be powered by the DC current rectified by a diode in a crystal receiver, to amplify the audio output enough to operate a loudspeaker. A crystal radio tuned to a strong local transmitter can also be used as a power source for a second amplified receiver of a distant station that cannot be heard without amplification.

== See also ==
- Batteryless radio
- Coherer
- Demodulator
- Detector (radio)
- Electrolytic detector
- History of radio
