= Spark-gap transmitter =

Type of radio transmitter

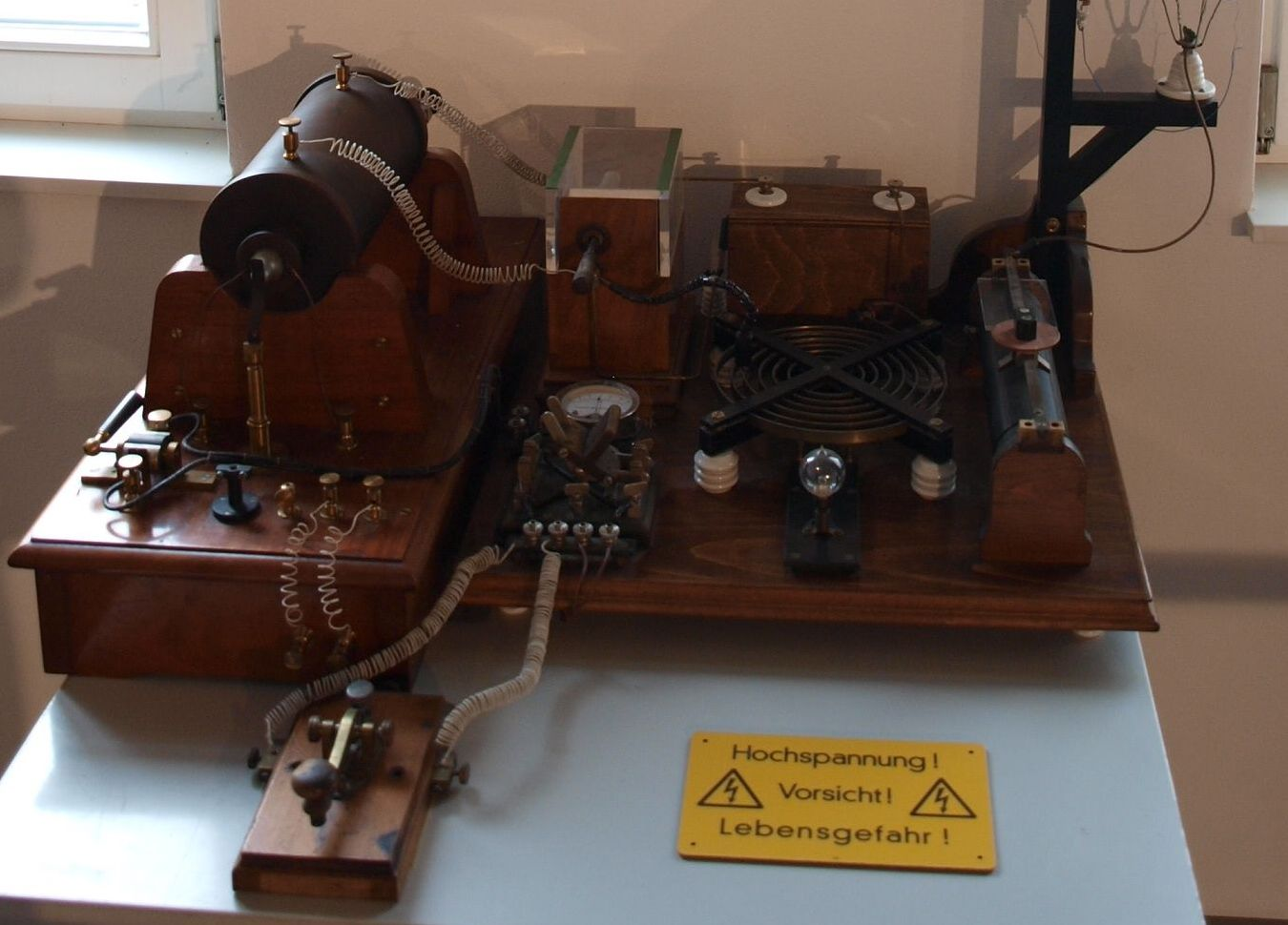
Low-power inductively coupled spark-gap transmitter on display in Electric Museum, Frastanz, Austria. The spark gap is inside the box with the transparent cover at top center.

A spark-gap transmitter is an obsolete type of radio transmitter which generates radio waves by means of an electric spark. Spark-gap transmitters were the first type of radio transmitter, and were the main type used during the wireless telegraphy or "spark" era, the first three decades of radio, from 1887 to the end of World War I. German physicist Heinrich Hertz built the first experimental spark-gap transmitters in 1887, with which he proved the existence of radio waves and studied their properties.

A fundamental limitation of spark-gap transmitters is that they generate a series of brief transient pulses of radio waves called damped waves; they are unable to produce the continuous waves used to carry audio (sound) in modern AM or FM radio transmission. So spark-gap transmitters could not transmit audio, and instead transmitted information by radiotelegraphy; the operator switched the transmitter on and off with a telegraph key, creating pulses of radio waves to spell out text messages in Morse code.

The first practical spark gap transmitters and receivers for radiotelegraphy communication were developed by Guglielmo Marconi around 1896. One of the first uses for spark-gap transmitters was on ships, to communicate with shore and broadcast a distress call if the ship was sinking. They played a crucial role in maritime rescues such as the 1912 RMS Titanic disaster. After World War I, vacuum tube transmitters were developed, which were less expensive and produced continuous waves which had a greater range, produced less interference, and could also carry audio, making spark transmitters obsolete by 1920. The radio signals produced by spark-gap transmitters are electrically "noisy"; they have a wide bandwidth, creating radio frequency interference (RFI) that can disrupt other radio transmissions. This type of radio emission has been prohibited by international law since 1934.

== Theory of operation ==
Electromagnetic waves are radiated by electric charges when they are accelerated. Radio waves, electromagnetic waves of radio frequency, can be generated by time-varying electric currents, consisting of electrons flowing through a conductor which suddenly change their velocity, thus accelerating.

An electrically charged capacitance discharged through an electric spark across a spark gap between two conductors was the first device known which could generate radio waves. The spark itself does not produce the radio waves; it merely serves as a fast-acting switch to excite resonant radio-frequency oscillating electric currents in the conductors of the attached circuit. The conductors radiate the energy in this oscillating current as radio waves.

Due to the inherent inductance of circuit conductors, the discharge of a capacitor through a low enough resistance (such as a spark) is oscillatory; the charge flows rapidly back and forth through the spark gap for a brief period, charging the conductors on each side alternately positive and negative, until the oscillations die away.

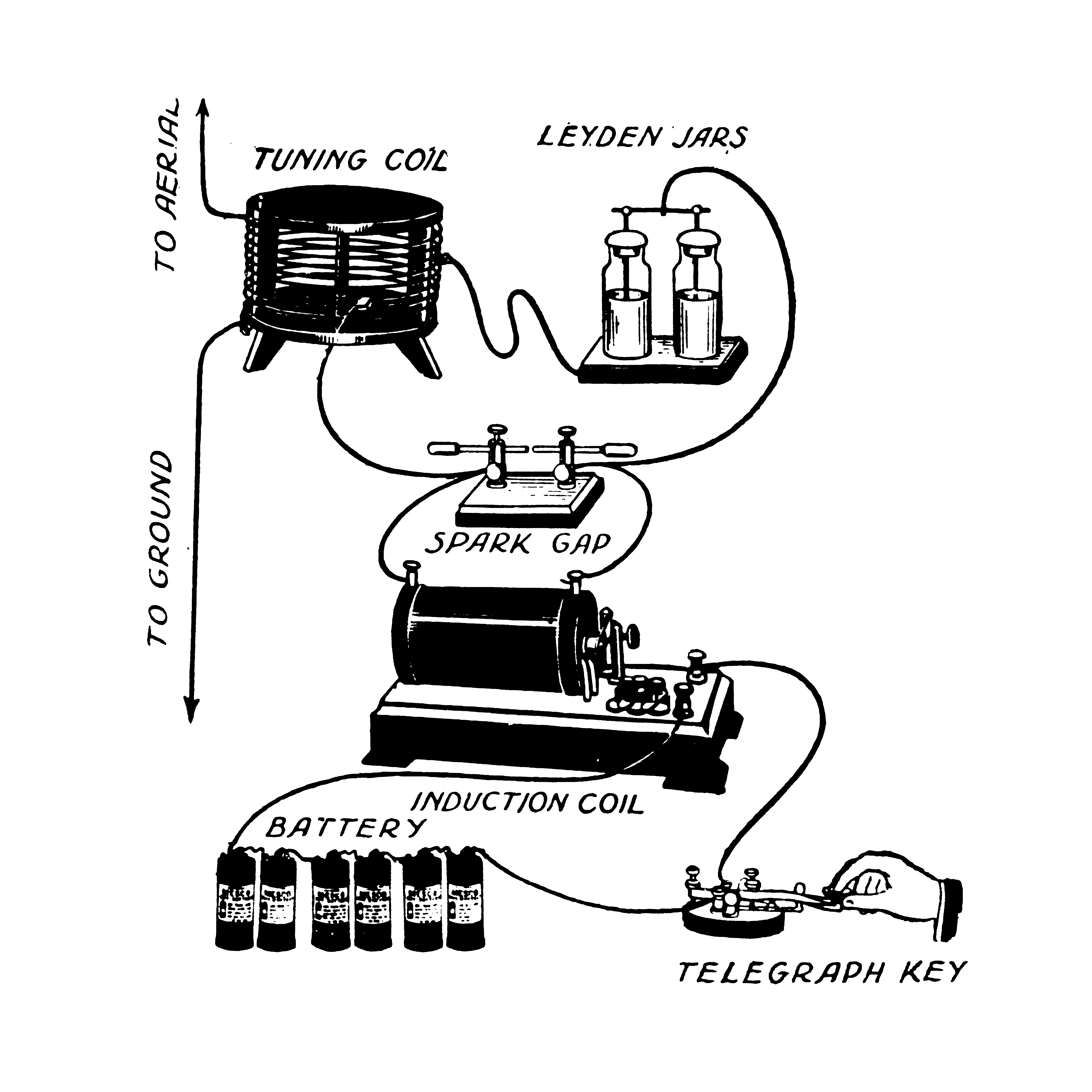
Pictorial diagram of a simple spark-gap transmitter from a 1917 boy's hobby book, showing examples of the early electronic components used. It is typical of the low-power transmitters homebuilt by thousands of amateurs during this period to explore the exciting new technology of radio.

A practical spark gap transmitter consists of these parts:

- A high-voltage transformer, to transform the low-voltage electricity from the power source, a battery or electric outlet, to a high enough voltage (from a few kilovolts to 75-100 kilovolts in powerful transmitters) to jump across the spark gap. The transformer charges the capacitor. In low-power transmitters powered by batteries, this was usually an induction coil (Ruhmkorff coil).
- One or more resonant circuits (tuned circuits or tank circuits) which create radio frequency electrical oscillations when excited by the spark. A resonant circuit consists of a capacitor (in early days a type called a Leyden jar) which stores high-voltage electricity from the transformer, and a coil of wire called an inductor or tuning coil, connected together. The values of the capacitance and inductance determine the frequency of the radio waves produced.
  - The earliest spark-gap transmitters before 1897 did not have a resonant circuit; the antenna performed this function, acting as a resonator. However, this meant that the electromagnetic energy produced by the transmitter was dissipated across a wide band, thereby limiting its effective range to a few kilometers at most.
  - Most spark transmitters had two resonant circuits coupled together with an air core transformer called a resonant transformer or oscillation transformer. This was called an inductively-coupled transmitter. The spark gap and capacitor connected to the primary winding of the transformer made one resonant circuit, which generated the oscillating current. The oscillating current in the primary winding created an oscillating magnetic field that induced current in the secondary winding. The antenna and ground were connected to the secondary winding. The capacitance of the antenna resonated with the secondary winding to make a second resonant circuit. The two resonant circuits were tuned to the same resonant frequency. The advantage of this circuit was that the oscillating current persisted in the antenna circuit even after the spark stopped, creating long, ringing, lightly damped waves, in which the energy was concentrated in a narrower bandwidth, creating less interference to other transmitters.
- A spark gap which acts as a voltage-controlled switch in the resonant circuit, discharging the capacitor through the coil.
- An antenna, a metal conductor such as an elevated wire, that radiates the power in the oscillating electric currents from the resonant circuit into space as radio waves.
- A telegraph key to switch the transmitter on and off to communicate messages by Morse code

=== Operation cycle ===
The transmitter works in a rapid repeating cycle in which the capacitor is charged to a high voltage by the transformer and discharged through the coil by a spark across the spark gap. The impulsive spark excites the resonant circuit to "ring" like a bell, producing a brief oscillating current which is radiated as electromagnetic waves by the antenna. The transmitter repeats this cycle at a rapid rate, so the spark appeared continuous, and the radio signal sounded like a whine or buzz in a radio receiver.

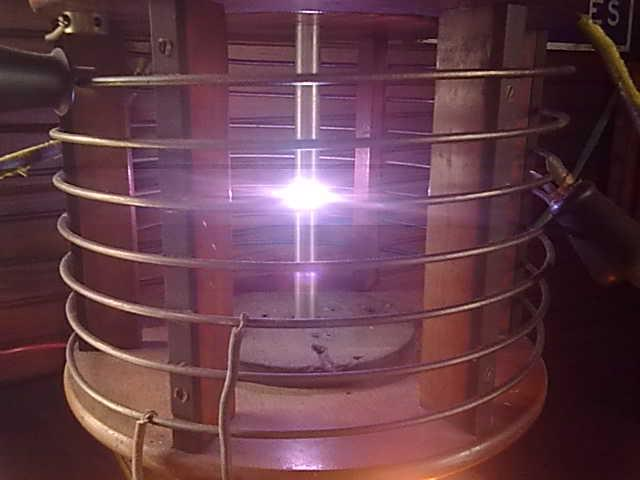
Demonstration of the restored 1907 Massie Wireless Station spark gap transmitter Audio of Massie spark gap transmission Morse code of "CQ DE PJ"

1. The cycle begins when current from the transformer charges up the capacitor, storing positive electric charge on one of its plates and negative charge on the other. While the capacitor is charging the spark gap is in its nonconductive state, preventing the charge from escaping through the coil.
2. When the voltage on the capacitor reaches the breakdown voltage of the spark gap, the air in the gap ionizes, starting an electric spark, reducing its resistance to a very low level (usually less than one ohm). This closes the circuit between the capacitor and the coil.
3. The charge on the capacitor discharges as a current through the coil and spark gap. Due to the inductance of the coil when the capacitor voltage reaches zero the current doesn't stop but keeps flowing, charging the capacitor plates with an opposite polarity, until the charge is stored in the capacitor again, on the opposite plates. Then the process repeats, with the charge flowing in the opposite direction through the coil. This continues, resulting in oscillating currents flowing rapidly back and forth between the plates of the capacitor through the coil and spark gap.
4. The resonant circuit is connected to the antenna, so these oscillating currents also flow in the antenna, charging and discharging it. The current creates an oscillating magnetic field around the antenna, while the voltage creates an oscillating electric field. These oscillating fields radiate away from the antenna into space as an electromagnetic wave; a radio wave.
5. The energy in the resonant circuit is limited to the amount of energy originally stored in the capacitor. The radiated radio waves, along with the heat generated by the spark, uses up this energy, causing the oscillations to decrease quickly in amplitude to zero. When the oscillating electric current in the primary circuit has decreased to a point where it is insufficient to keep the air in the spark gap ionized, the spark stops, opening the resonant circuit, and stopping the oscillations. In a transmitter with two resonant circuits, the oscillations in the secondary circuit and antenna may continue some time after the spark has terminated. Then the transformer begins charging the capacitor again, and the whole cycle repeats.

The cycle is very rapid, taking less than a millisecond. With each spark, this cycle produces a radio signal consisting of an oscillating sinusoidal wave that increases rapidly to a high amplitude and decreases exponentially to zero, called a damped wave. The frequency $f$ of the oscillations, which is the frequency of the emitted radio waves, is equal to the resonant frequency of the resonant circuit, determined by the capacitance $C$ of the capacitor and the inductance $L$ of the coil:

$$f = \frac {1}{2 \pi} \sqrt { \frac {1}{LC}} \,$$

The transmitter repeats this cycle rapidly, so the output is a repeating string of damped waves. This is equivalent to a radio signal amplitude modulated with a steady frequency, so it could be demodulated in a radio receiver by a rectifying AM detector, such as the crystal detector or Fleming valve used during the wireless telegraphy era. The frequency of repetition (spark rate) is in the audio range, typically 50 to 1000 sparks per second, so in a receiver's earphones the signal sounds like a steady tone, whine, or buzz.

In order to transmit information with this signal, the operator turns the transmitter on and off rapidly by tapping on a switch called a telegraph key in the primary circuit of the transformer, producing sequences of short (dot) and long (dash) strings of damped waves, to spell out messages in Morse code. As long as the key is pressed the spark gap fires repetitively, creating a string of pulses of radio waves, so in a receiver the keypress sounds like a buzz; the entire Morse code message sounds like a sequence of buzzes separated by pauses. In low-power transmitters the key directly breaks the primary circuit of the supply transformer, while in high-power transmitters the key operates a heavy duty relay that breaks the primary circuit.

=== Charging circuit and spark rate ===
The circuit which charges the capacitors, along with the spark gap itself, determines the spark rate of the transmitter, the number of sparks and resulting damped wave pulses it produces per second, which determines the tone of the signal heard in the receiver. The spark rate should not be confused with the frequency of the transmitter, which is the number of sinusoidal oscillations per second in each damped wave. Since the transmitter produces one pulse of radio waves per spark, the output power of the transmitter was proportional to the spark rate, so higher rates were favored. Spark transmitters generally used one of three types of power circuits:

==== Induction coil ====
An induction coil (Ruhmkorff coil) was used in low-power transmitters, usually less than 500 watts, often battery-powered. An induction coil is a type of transformer powered by DC, in which a vibrating arm switch contact on the coil called an interrupter repeatedly breaks the circuit that provides current to the primary winding, causing the coil to generate pulses of high voltage. When the primary current to the coil is turned on, the primary winding creates a magnetic field in the iron core which pulls the springy interrupter arm away from its contact, opening the switch and cutting off the primary current. Then the magnetic field collapses, creating a pulse of high voltage in the secondary winding, and the interrupter arm springs back to close the contact again, and the cycle repeats. Each pulse of high voltage charged up the capacitor until the spark gap fired, resulting in one spark per pulse. Interrupters were limited to low spark rates of 20–100 Hz, sounding like a low buzz in the receiver. In powerful induction coil transmitters, instead of a vibrating interrupter, a mercury turbine interrupter was used. This could break the current at rates up to several thousand hertz, and the rate could be adjusted to produce the best tone.

==== AC transformer ====
In higher power transmitters powered by AC, a transformer steps the input voltage up to the high voltage needed. The sinusoidal voltage from the transformer is applied directly to the capacitor, so the voltage on the capacitor varies from a high positive voltage, to zero, to a high negative voltage. The spark gap is adjusted so sparks only occur near the maximum voltage, at peaks of the AC sine wave, when the capacitor was fully charged. Since the AC sine wave has two peaks per cycle, ideally two sparks occurred during each cycle, so the spark rate was equal to twice the frequency of the AC power (often multiple sparks occurred during the peak of each half cycle). The spark rate of transmitters powered by 50 or 60 Hz mains power was thus 100 or 120 Hz. However higher audio frequencies cut through interference better, so in many transmitters the transformer was powered by a motor–alternator set, an electric motor with its shaft turning an alternator, that produced AC at a higher frequency, usually 500 Hz, resulting in a spark rate of 1000 Hz.

==== Quenched spark gap ====
The speed at which signals may be transmitted is naturally limited by the time taken for the spark to be extinguished. If, as described above, the conductive plasma does not, during the zero points of the alternating current, cool enough to extinguish the spark, a 'persistent spark' is maintained until the stored energy is dissipated, permitting practical operation only up to around 60 signals per second. If active measures are taken to break the arc (either by blowing air through the spark or by lengthening the spark gap), a much shorter "quenched spark" may be obtained. A simple quenched spark system still permits several oscillations of the capacitor circuit in the time taken for the spark to be quenched. With the spark circuit broken, the transmission frequency is solely determined by the antenna resonant circuit, which permits simpler tuning.

==== Rotary spark gap ====
In a transmitter with a "rotary" spark gap (below), the capacitor was charged by AC from a high-voltage transformer as above, and discharged by a spark gap consisting of electrodes spaced around a wheel which was spun by an electric motor, which produced sparks as they passed by a stationary electrode. The spark rate was equal to the rotations per second times the number of spark electrodes on the wheel. It could produce spark rates up to several thousand hertz, and the rate could be adjusted by changing the speed of the motor. The rotation of the wheel was usually synchronized to the AC sine wave so the moving electrode passed by the stationary one at the peak of the sine wave, initiating the spark when the capacitor was fully charged, which produced a musical tone in the receiver. When tuned correctly in this manner, the need for external cooling or quenching airflow was eliminated, as was the loss of power directly from the charging circuit (parallel to the capacitor) through the spark.

== History ==
The invention of the radio transmitter resulted from the convergence of two lines of research.

One was efforts by inventors to devise a system to transmit telegraph signals without wires. Experiments by a number of inventors had shown that electrical disturbances could be transmitted short distances through the air. However most of these systems worked not by radio waves but by electrostatic induction or electromagnetic induction, which had too short a range to be practical. In 1866 Mahlon Loomis claimed to have transmitted an electrical signal through the atmosphere between two 600 foot wires held aloft by kites on mountaintops 14 miles apart. Thomas Edison had come close to discovering radio in 1875; he had generated and detected radio waves which he called "etheric currents" experimenting with high-voltage spark circuits, but due to lack of time did not pursue the matter. David Edward Hughes in 1879 had also stumbled on radio wave transmission which he received with his carbon microphone detector, however he was persuaded that what he observed was induction. Neither of these individuals are usually credited with the discovery of radio, because they did not understand the significance of their observations and did not publish their work before Hertz.

The other was research by physicists to confirm the theory of electromagnetism proposed in 1864 by Scottish physicist James Clerk Maxwell, now called Maxwell's equations. Maxwell's theory predicted that a combination of oscillating electric and magnetic fields could travel through space as an "electromagnetic wave". Maxwell proposed that light consisted of electromagnetic waves of short wavelength, but no one knew how to confirm this, or generate or detect electromagnetic waves of other wavelengths. By 1883 it was theorized that accelerated electric charges could produce electromagnetic waves, and George Fitzgerald had calculated the output power of a loop antenna. Fitzgerald in a brief note published in 1883 suggested that electromagnetic waves could be generated practically by discharging a capacitor rapidly; the method used in spark transmitters, however there is no indication that this inspired other inventors.

The division of the history of spark transmitters into the different types below follows the organization of the subject used in many wireless textbooks.

=== Hertzian oscillators ===
German physicist Heinrich Hertz in 1887 built the first experimental spark gap transmitters during his historic experiments to demonstrate the existence of electromagnetic waves predicted by James Clerk Maxwell in 1864, in which he discovered radio waves, which were called "Hertzian waves" until about 1910. Hertz was inspired to try spark excited circuits by experiments with "Reiss spirals", a pair of flat spiral inductors with their conductors ending in spark gaps. A Leyden jar capacitor discharged through one spiral, would cause sparks in the gap of the other spiral.

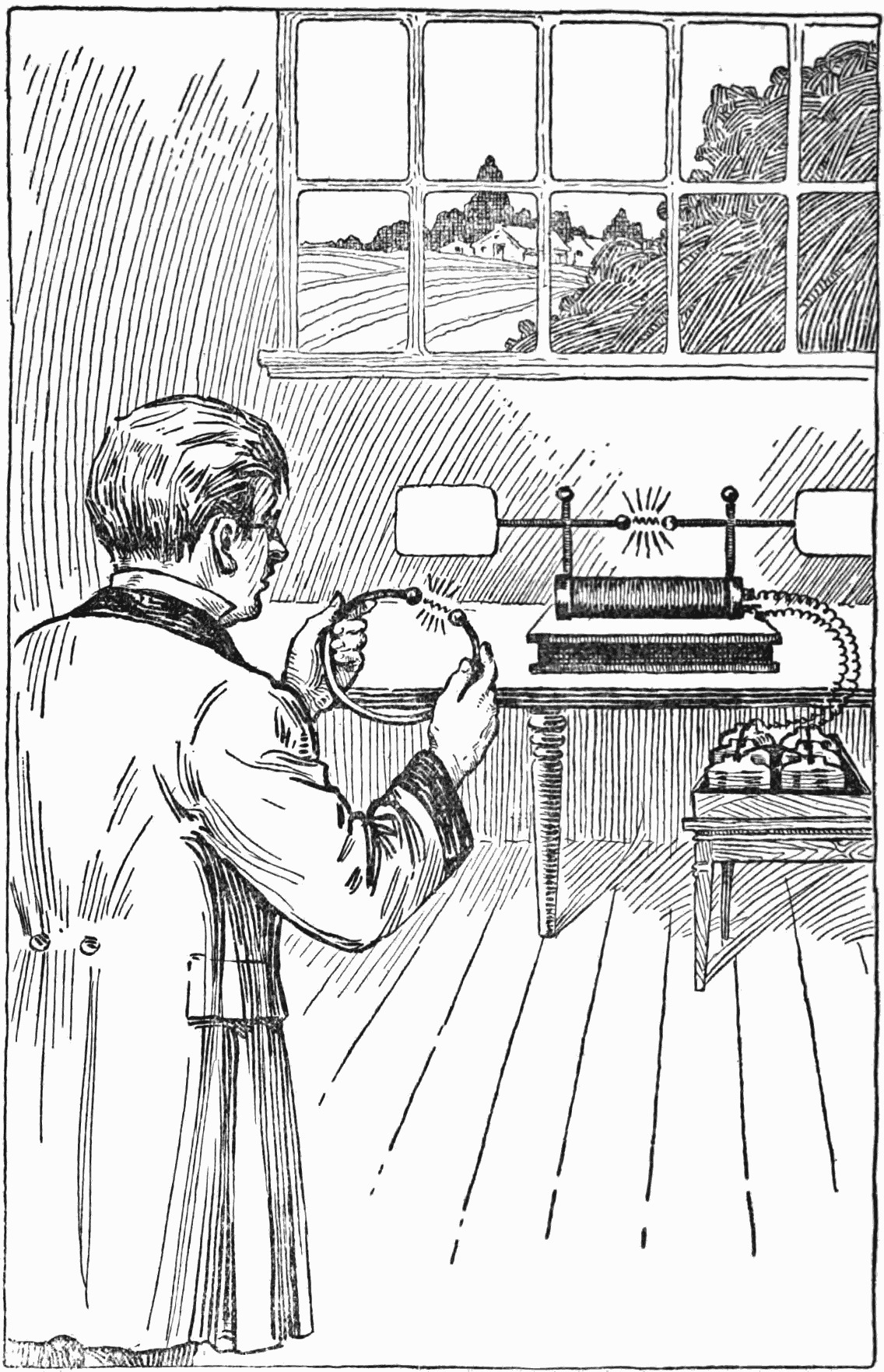
Heinrich Hertz discovering radio waves with his spark oscillator (at rear)

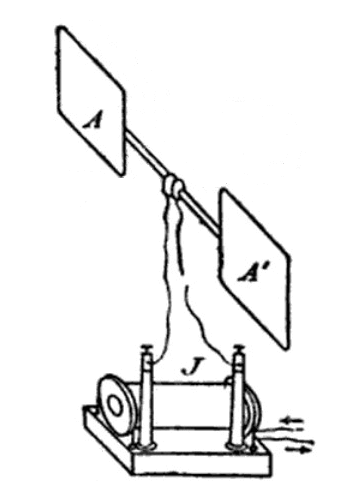
Hertz's drawing of one of his spark oscillators. (A,A') antenna, (J) induction coil

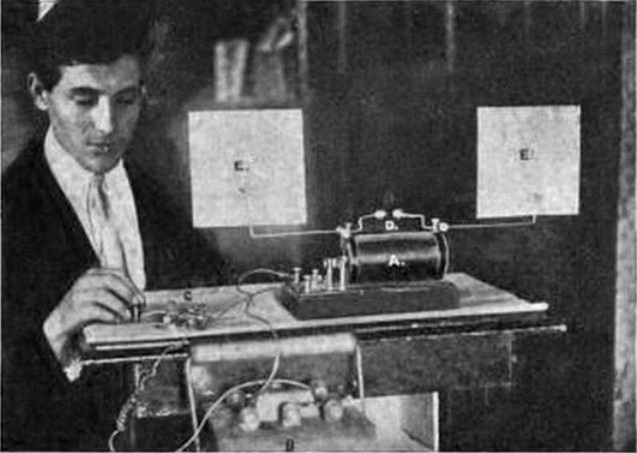
Hertzian spark oscillator, 1902. Visible are antenna consisting of 2 wires ending in metal plates (E), spark gap (D), induction coil (A), auto battery (B), and telegraph key (C).

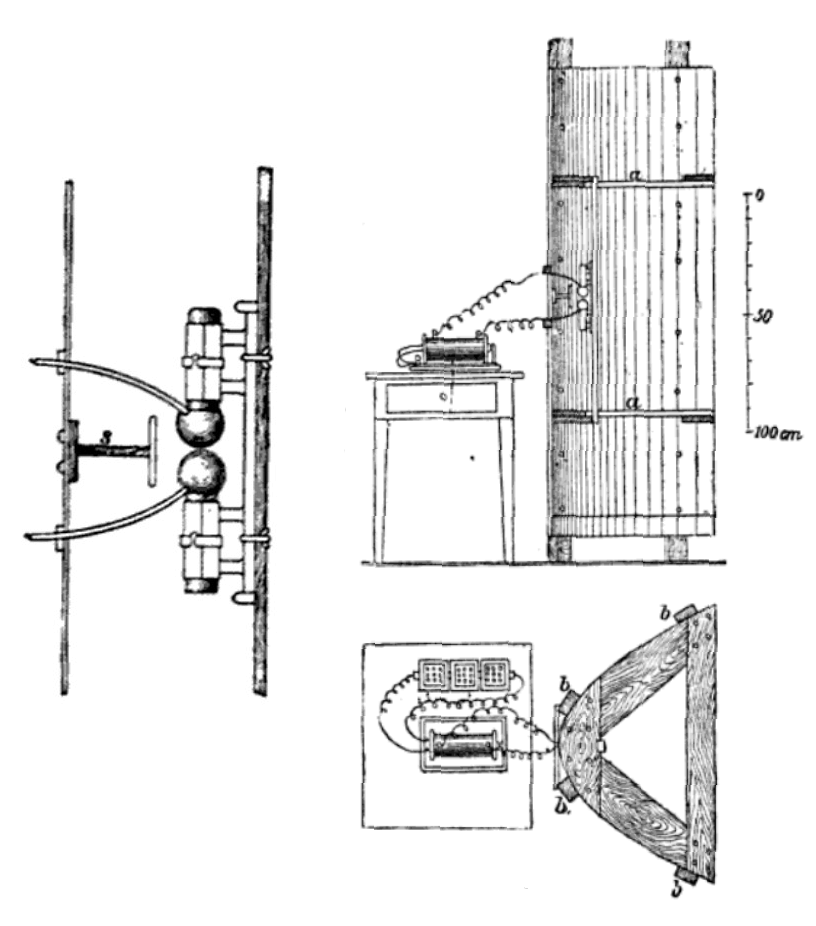
Hertz's 450 MHz transmitter; a 26 cm dipole with spark gap at focus of a sheet metal parabolic reflector

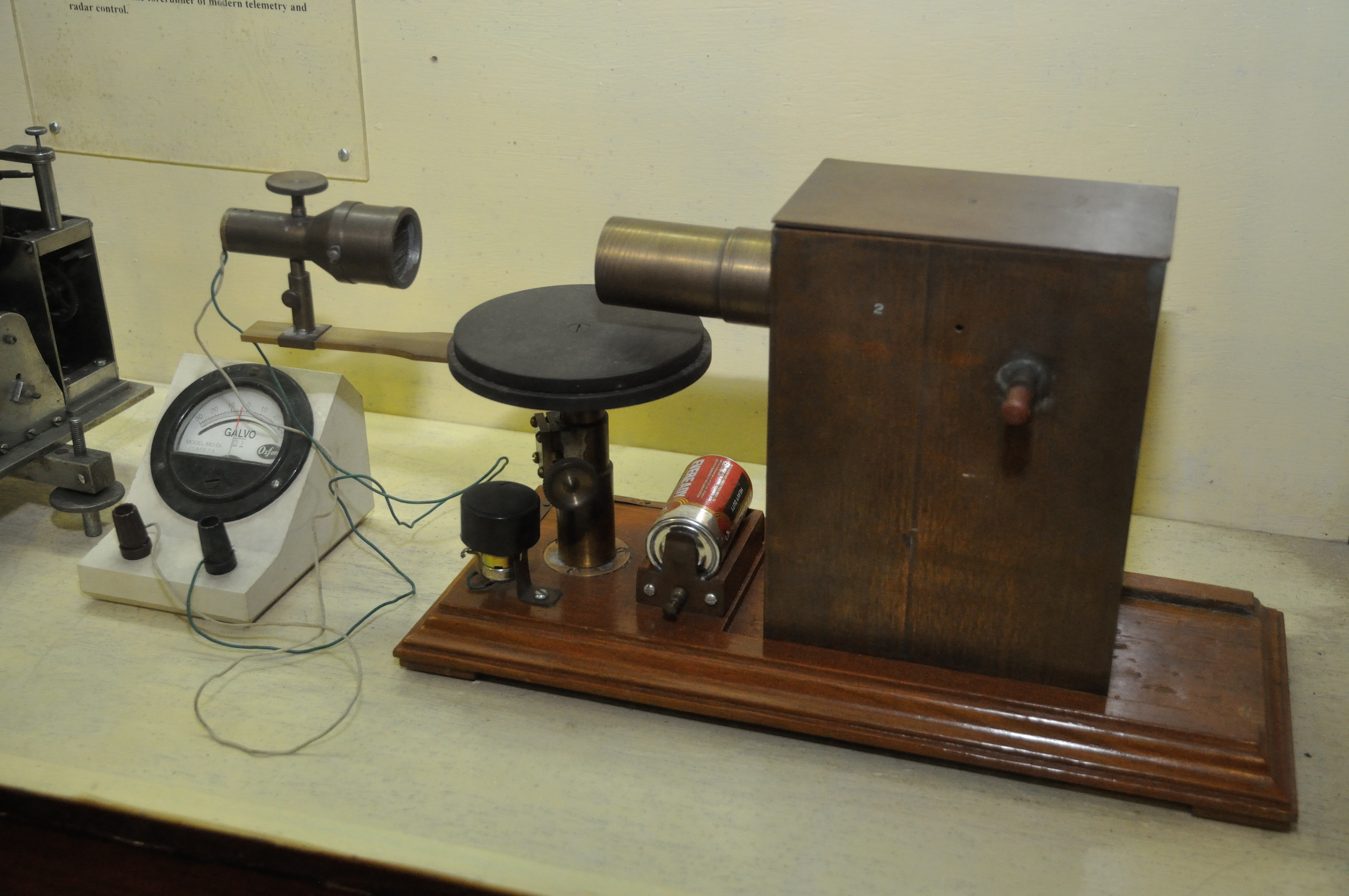
Jagadish Chandra Bose in 1894 was the first person to produce millimeter waves; his spark oscillator (in box, right) generated 60 GHz (5 mm) waves using 3 mm metal ball resonators.

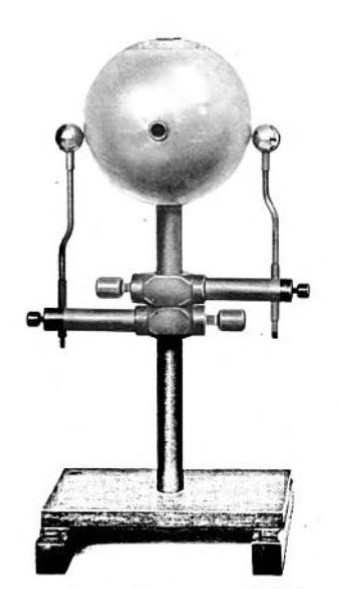
Spark oscillator ball used by Oliver Lodge in 1894 to generate 25 cm ( 1.2 GHz) microwaves

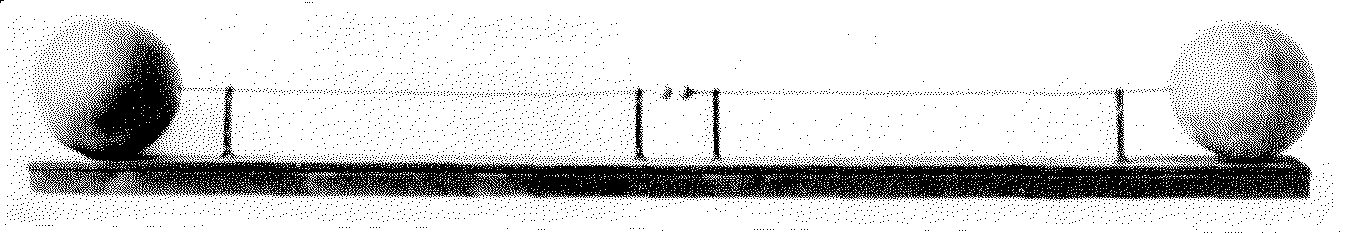
Hertz's first oscillator: a pair of one meter copper wires with a 7.5 mm spark gap between them, ending in 30 cm zinc spheres. When 20,000 volt pulses from an induction coil (not shown) was applied, it produced waves at a frequency of roughly 50 MHz.

See circuit diagram. Hertz's transmitters consisted of a dipole antenna made of a pair of collinear metal rods of various lengths with a spark gap (S) between their inner ends and metal balls or plates for capacitance (C) attached to the outer ends. The two sides of the antenna were connected to an induction coil (Ruhmkorff coil) (T) a common lab power source which produced pulses of high voltage, 5 to 30 kV. In addition to radiating the waves, the antenna also acted as a harmonic oscillator (resonator) which generated the oscillating currents. High-voltage pulses from the induction coil (T) were applied between the two sides of the antenna. Each pulse stored electric charge in the capacitance of the antenna, which was immediately discharged by a spark across the spark gap. The spark excited brief oscillating standing waves of current between the sides of the antenna. The antenna radiated the energy as a momentary pulse of radio waves; a damped wave. The frequency of the waves was equal to the resonant frequency of the antenna, which was determined by its length; it acted as a half-wave dipole, which radiated waves roughly twice the length of the antenna (for example a dipole 1 meter long would generate 150 MHz radio waves). Hertz detected the waves by observing tiny sparks in micrometer spark gaps (M) in loops of wire which functioned as resonant receiving antennas. Oliver Lodge was also experimenting with spark oscillators at this time and came close to discovering radio waves before Hertz, but his focus was on waves on wires, not in free space.

Circuit of Hertz's spark oscillator and receiver. The interrupter (I) and capacitor in the primary circuit of the induction coil produced a continuous string of damped waves. Hertz often just used a pushbutton switch, which created a single spark and pulse of radio waves when pushed, resulting in a single spark in his receiver.

Hertz and the first generation of physicists who built these "Hertzian oscillators", such as Jagadish Chandra Bose, Lord Rayleigh, George Fitzgerald, Frederick Trouton, Augusto Righi and Oliver Lodge, were mainly interested in radio waves as a scientific phenomenon, and largely failed to foresee its possibilities as a communication technology. Due to the influence of Maxwell's theory, their thinking was dominated by the similarity between radio waves and light waves; they thought of radio waves as an invisible form of light. By analogy with light, they assumed that radio waves only traveled in straight lines, so they thought radio transmission was limited by the visual horizon like existing optical signalling methods such as semaphore, and therefore was not capable of longer distance communication. As late as 1894 Oliver Lodge speculated that the maximum distance Hertzian waves could be transmitted was a half mile.

To investigate the similarity between radio waves and light waves, these researchers concentrated on producing short wavelength high-frequency waves with which they could duplicate classic optics experiments with radio waves, using quasioptical components such as prisms and lenses made of paraffin wax, sulfur, and pitch and wire diffraction gratings. Their short antennas generated radio waves in the VHF, UHF, or microwave bands. In his various experiments, Hertz produced waves with frequencies from 50 to 450 MHz, roughly the frequencies used today by broadcast television transmitters. Hertz used them to perform historic experiments demonstrating standing waves, refraction, diffraction, polarization and interference of radio waves. He also measured the speed of radio waves, showing they traveled at the same speed as light. These experiments established that light and radio waves were both forms of Maxwell's electromagnetic waves, differing only in frequency. Augusto Righi and Jagadish Chandra Bose around 1894 generated microwaves of 12 and 60 GHz respectively, using small metal balls as resonator-antennas.

The high frequencies produced by Hertzian oscillators could not travel beyond the horizon. The dipole resonators also had low capacitance and couldn't store much charge, limiting their power output. Therefore, these devices were not capable of long distance transmission; their reception range with the primitive receivers employed was typically limited to roughly 100 yards (100 meters).

=== Non-syntonic transmitters ===
I could scarcely conceive it possible that [radio's] application to useful purposes could have escaped the notice of such eminent scientists.

— Guglielmo Marconi

Italian radio pioneer Guglielmo Marconi was one of the first people to believe that radio waves could be used for long distance communication, and singlehandedly developed the first practical radiotelegraphy transmitters and receivers, mainly by combining and tinkering with the inventions of others. Starting at age 21 on his family's estate in Italy, between 1894 and 1901 he conducted a long series of experiments to increase the transmission range of Hertz's spark oscillators and receivers.

Evolution of Marconi's monopole antenna from Hertz's dipole antenna

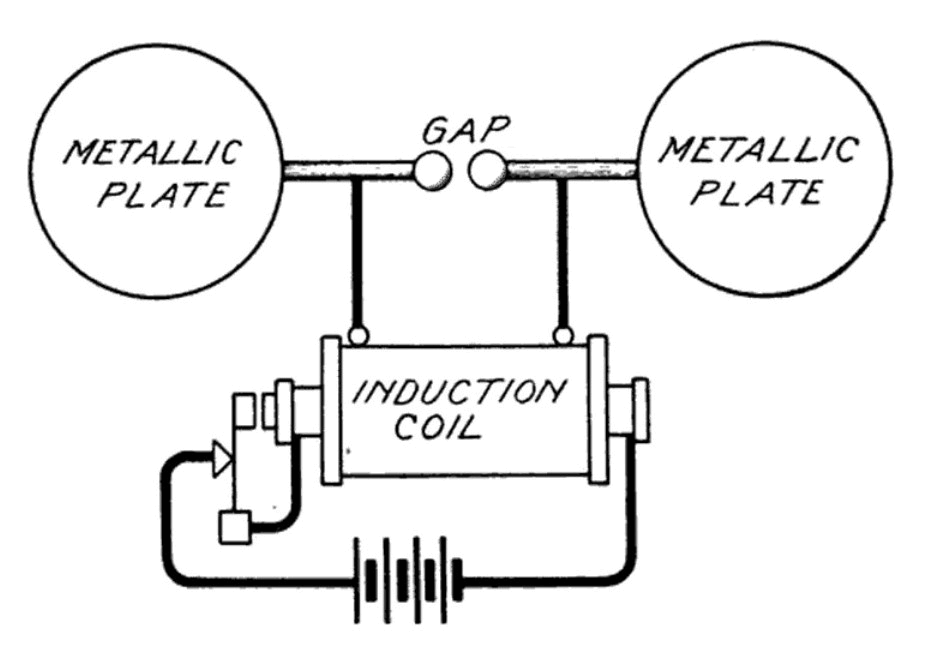
Hertz's dipole oscillator

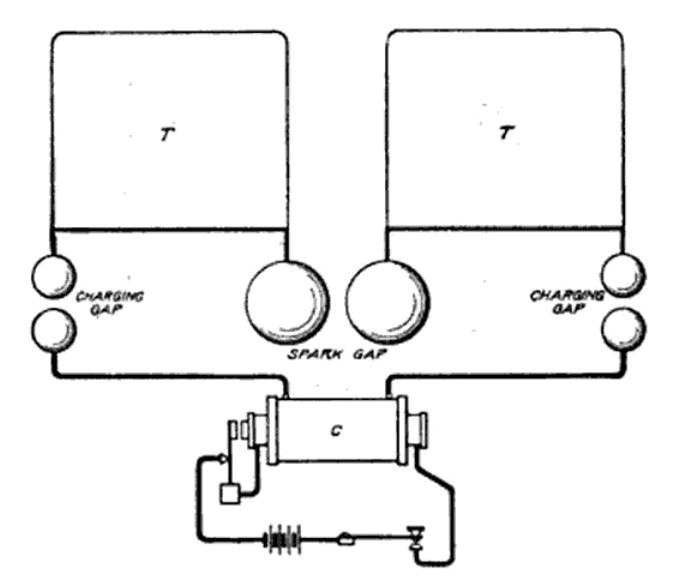
Marconi first tried enlarging the dipole antenna with 6×6 foot metal sheet "capacity areas" (r), 1895 Metal sheets and spark balls not shown to scale.

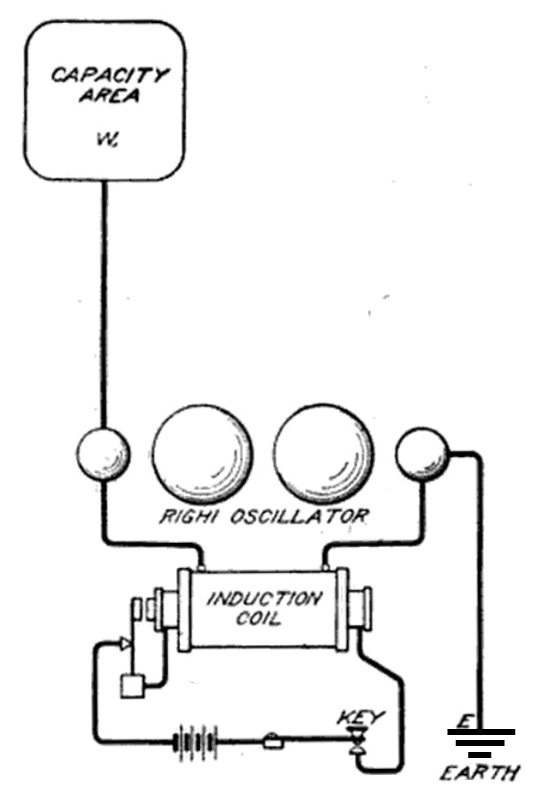
Marconi's first monopole antenna transmitter, 1895. One side of spark gap grounded, the other attached to a metal plate (W).

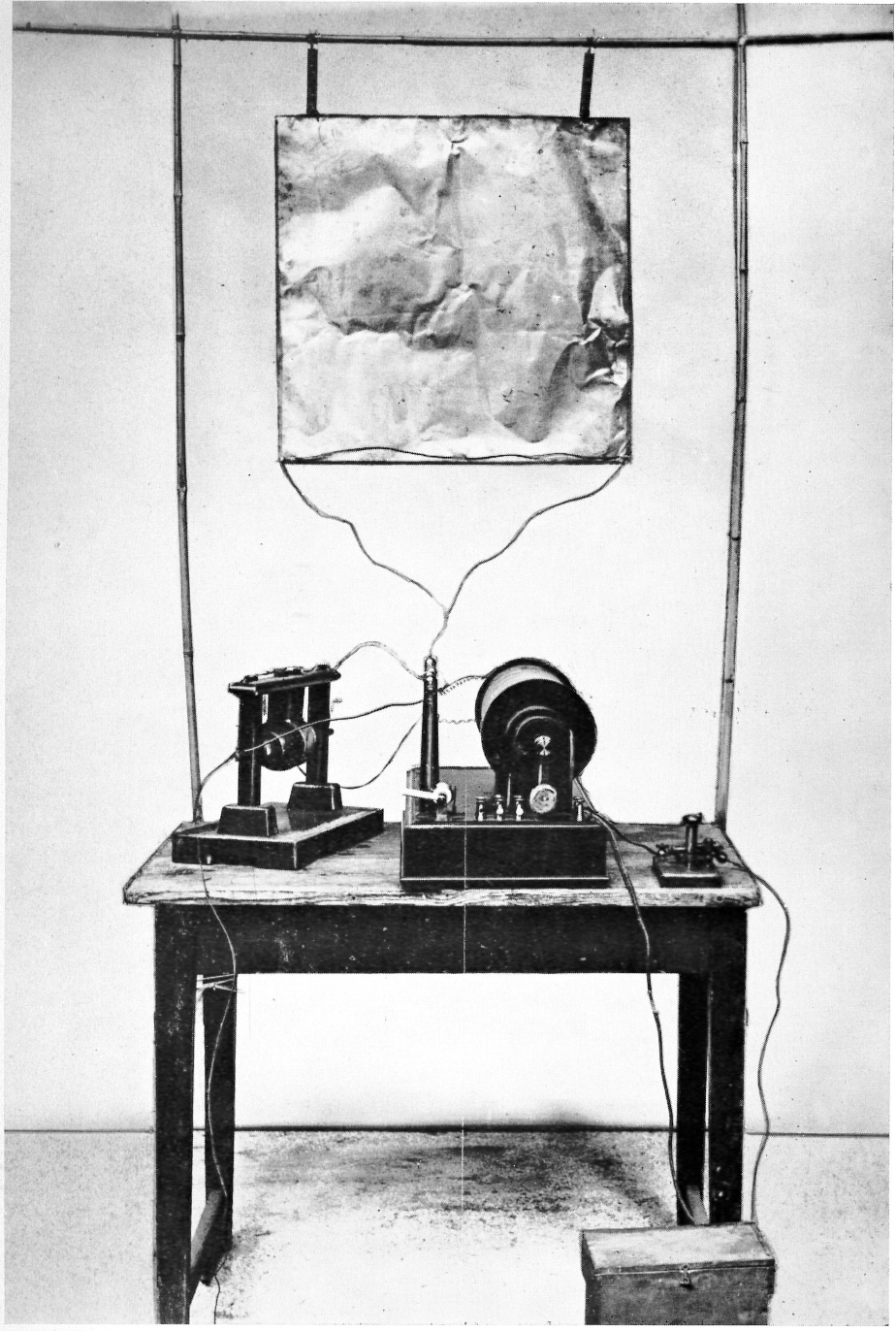
Re-creation of Marconi's first monopole transmitter

Early vertical antennas. (A) Marconi found suspending the metal plate "capacity area" high above the ground increased range. (B) He found that a simple elevated wire worked just as well. (C-F) Later researchers found that multiple parallel wires were a better way to increase capacitance. "Cage antennas" (E-F) distributed current more equally between wires, reducing resistance

He was unable to communicate beyond a half-mile until 1895, when he discovered that the range of transmission could be increased greatly by replacing one side of the Hertzian dipole antenna in his transmitter and receiver with a connection to Earth and the other side with a long wire antenna suspended high above the ground. These antennas functioned as quarter-wave monopole antennas. The length of the antenna determined the wavelength of the waves produced and thus their frequency. Longer, lower frequency waves have less attenuation with distance. As Marconi tried longer antennas, which radiated lower frequency waves, probably in the MF band around 2 MHz, he found that he could transmit further. Another advantage was that these vertical antennas radiated vertically polarized waves, instead of the horizontally polarized waves produced by Hertz's horizontal antennas. These longer vertically polarized waves could travel beyond the horizon, because they propagated as a ground wave that followed the contour of the Earth. Under certain conditions they could also reach beyond the horizon by reflecting off layers of charged particles (ions) in the upper atmosphere, later called skywave propagation. Marconi did not understand any of this at the time; he simply found empirically that the higher his vertical antenna was suspended, the further it would transmit.

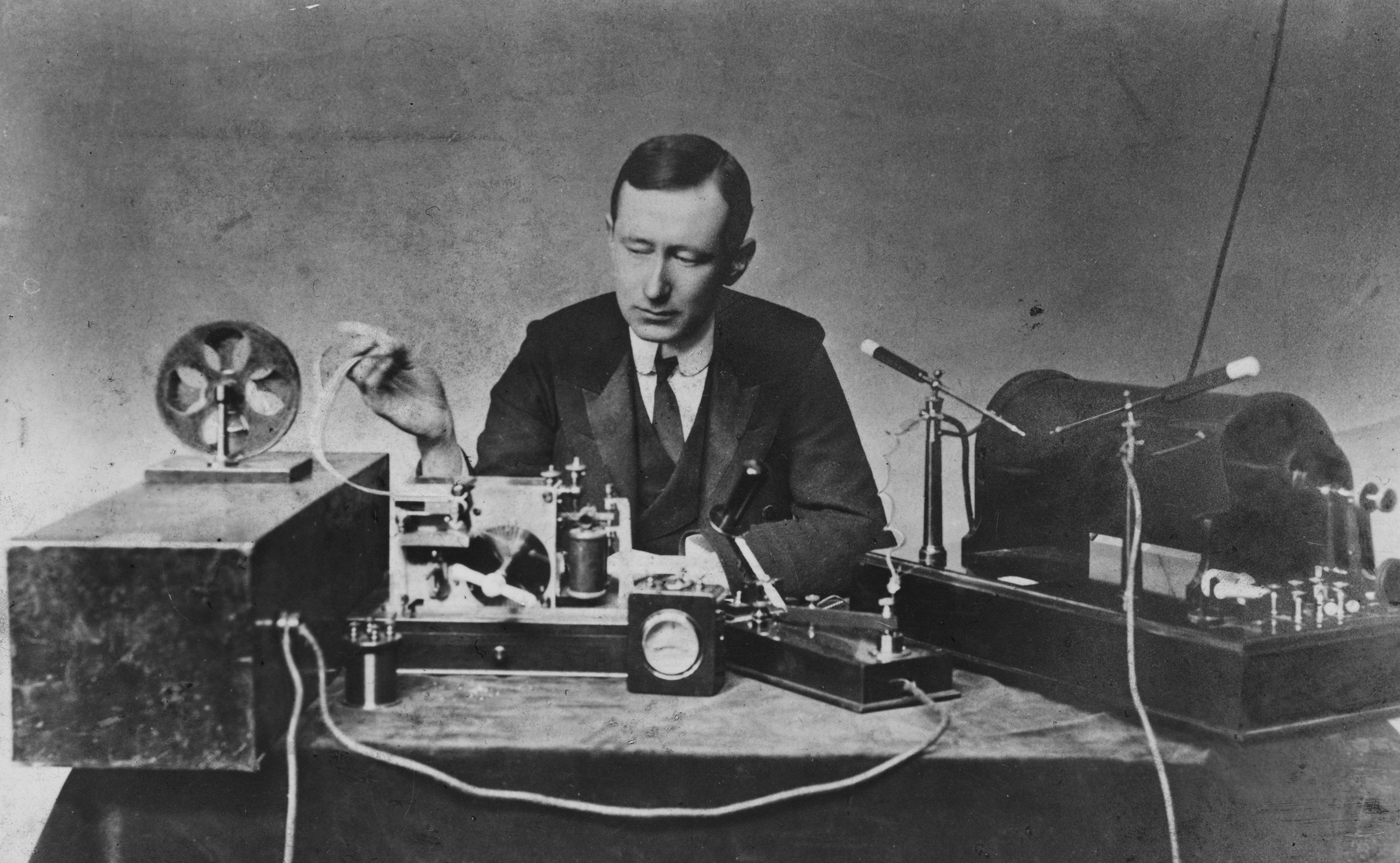
Marconi in 1901 with his early spark transmitter (right) and coherer receiver (left), which recorded the Morse code symbols with an ink line on a paper tape.

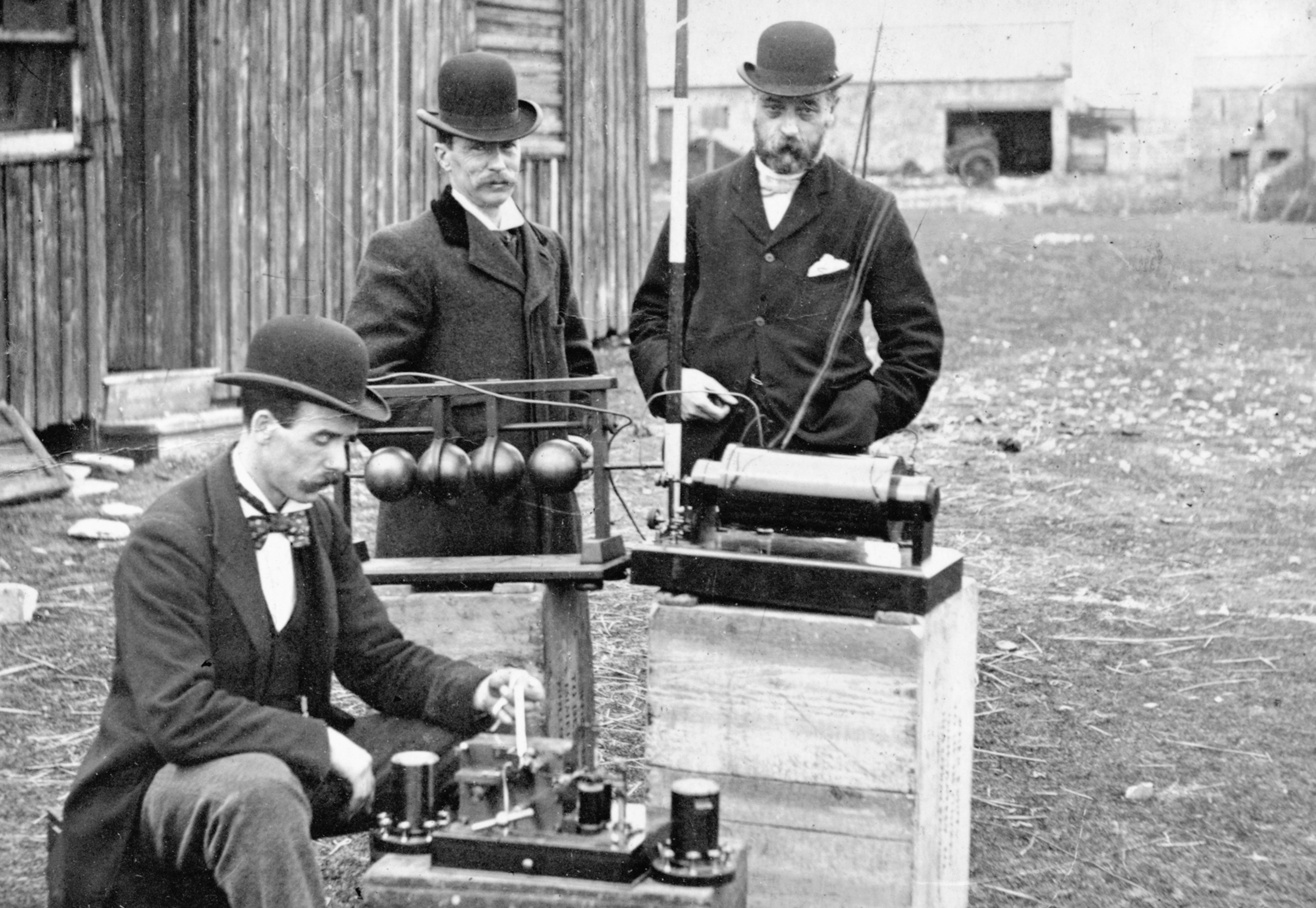
British Post Office officials examining Marconi's transmitter (center) and receiver (bottom) during a demonstration 1897. The pole supporting the vertical wire antenna is visible at center.

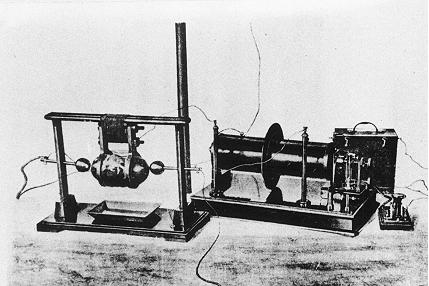
Marconi's transmitter in July 1897. (left) 4 ball Righi spark gap, (right) Induction coil, telegraph key, and battery box.

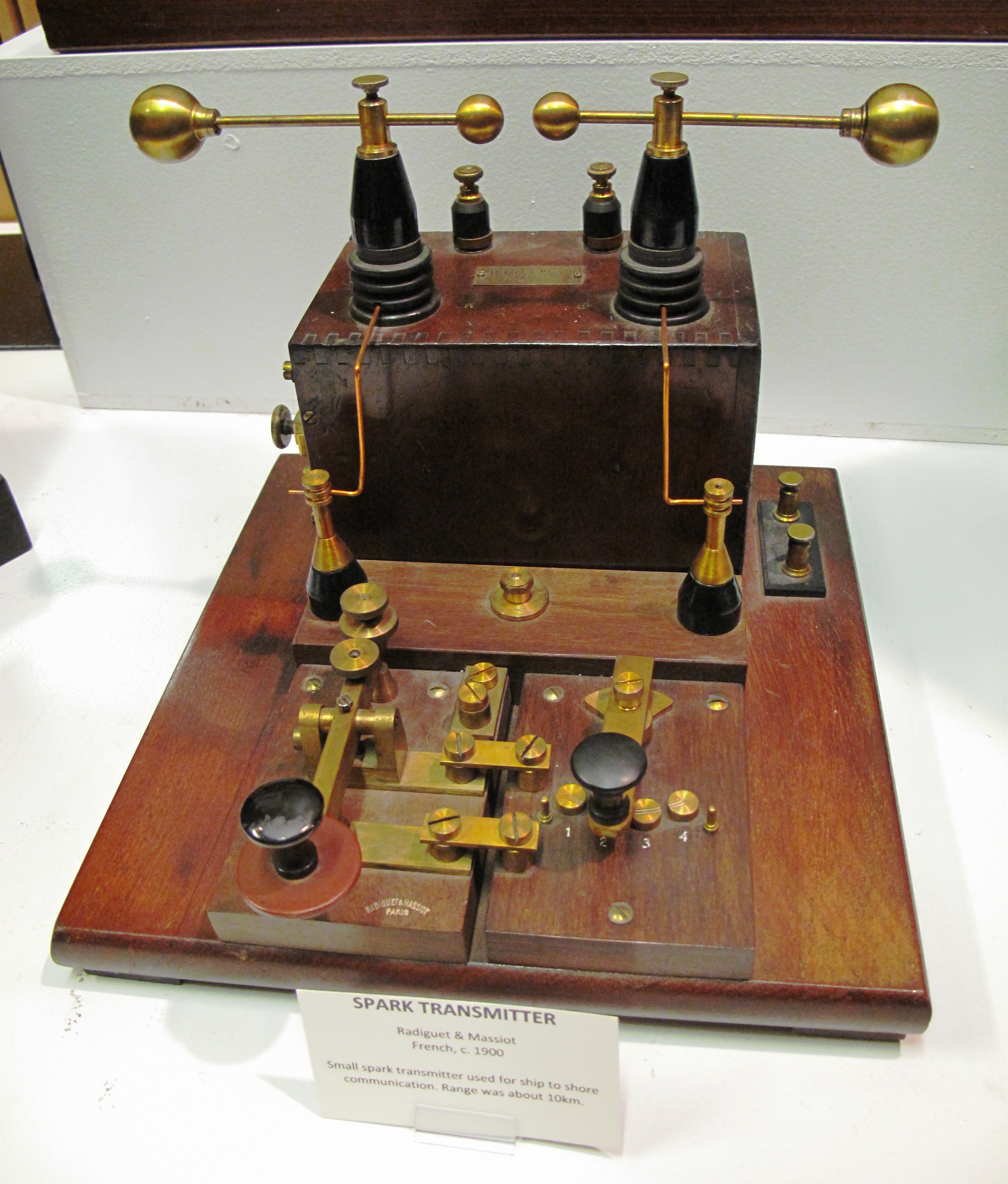
French non-syntonic transmitter used for ship-to-shore communication around 1900. It had a range of about 10 kilometres (6.2 miles).

After failing to interest the Italian government, in 1896 Marconi moved to England, where William Preece of the British General Post Office funded his experiments. Marconi applied for a patent on his radio system 2 June 1896, often considered the first wireless patent. In May 1897 he transmitted 14 km (8.7 miles), on 27 March 1899 he transmitted across the English Channel, 46 km (28 miles), in fall 1899 he extended the range to 136 km (85 miles), and by January 1901 he had reached 315 km (196 miles). These demonstrations of wireless Morse code communication at increasingly long distances convinced the world that radio, or "wireless telegraphy" as it was called, was not just a scientific curiosity but a commercially useful communication technology.

In 1897 Marconi started a company to produce his radio systems, which became the Marconi Wireless Telegraph Company. and radio communication began to be used commercially around 1900. His first large contract in 1901 was with the insurance firm Lloyd's of London to equip their ships with wireless stations. Marconi's company dominated marine radio throughout the spark era. Inspired by Marconi, in the late 1890s other researchers also began developing competing spark radio communication systems; Alexander Popov in Russia, Eugène Ducretet in France, Reginald Fessenden and Lee de Forest in America, and Karl Ferdinand Braun, Adolf Slaby, and Georg von Arco in Germany who in 1903 formed the Telefunken Co., Marconi's chief rival.

==== Disadvantages ====
Circuit of Marconi's monopole transmitter and all other transmitters prior to 1897.

The primitive transmitters prior to 1897 had no resonant circuits (also called LC circuits, tank circuits, or tuned circuits), the spark gap was in the antenna, which functioned as the resonator to determine the frequency of the radio waves. These were called "unsyntonized" or "plain antenna" transmitters.

The average power output of these transmitters was low, because due to its low capacitance the antenna was a highly damped oscillator (in modern terminology, it had very low Q factor). During each spark the energy stored in the antenna was quickly radiated away as radio waves, so the oscillations decayed to zero quickly. The radio signal consisted of brief pulses of radio waves, repeating tens or at most a few hundreds of times per second, separated by comparatively long intervals of no output. The power radiated was dependent on how much electric charge could be stored in the antenna before each spark, which was proportional to the capacitance of the antenna. To increase their capacitance to ground, antennas were made with multiple parallel wires, often with capacitive toploads, in the "harp", "cage", "umbrella", "inverted-L", and "T" antennas characteristic of the "spark" era. The only other way to increase the energy stored in the antenna was to charge it up to very high voltages. However the voltage that could be used was limited to about 100 kV by corona discharge which caused charge to leak off the antenna, particularly in wet weather, and also energy lost as heat in the longer spark.

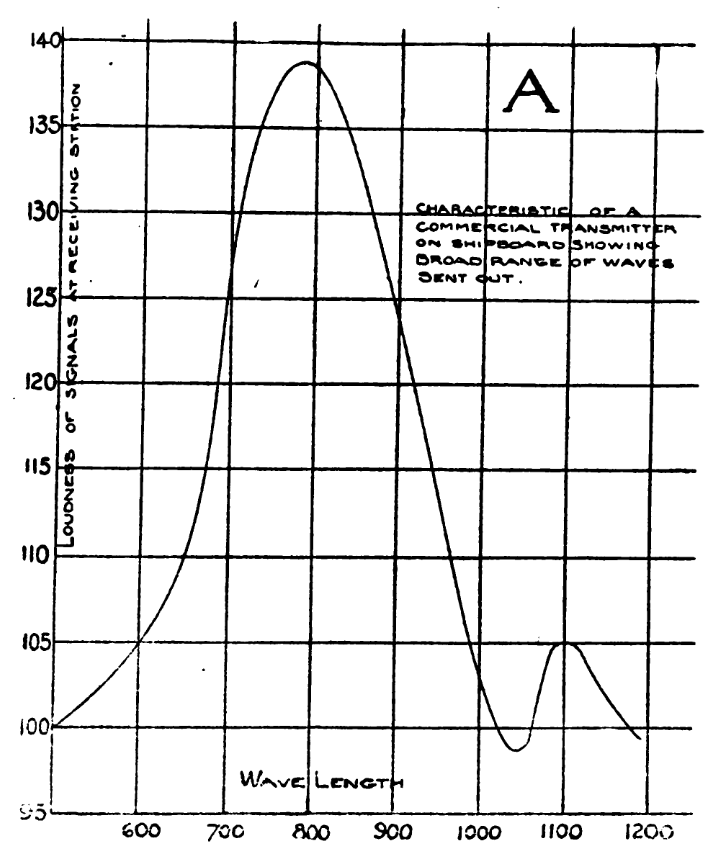
Emission bandwidth of a spark gap transmitter showing signal strength versus wavelength in meters

A more significant drawback of the large damping was that the radio transmissions were electrically "noisy"; they had a very large bandwidth. These transmitters did not produce waves of a single frequency, but a continuous band of frequencies. They were essentially radio noise sources radiating energy over a large part of the radio spectrum, which made it impossible for other transmitters to be heard. When multiple transmitters attempted to operate in the same area, their broad signals overlapped in frequency and interfered with each other. The radio receivers used also had no resonant circuits, so they had no way of selecting one signal from others besides the broad resonance of the antenna, and responded to the transmissions of all transmitters in the vicinity. An example of this interference problem was an embarrassing public debacle in August 1901 when Marconi, Lee de Forest, and G. W. Pickard attempted to report the New York Yacht Race to newspapers from ships with their untuned spark transmitters. The Morse code transmissions interfered, and the reporters on shore failed to receive any information from the garbled signals.

=== Syntonic transmitters ===
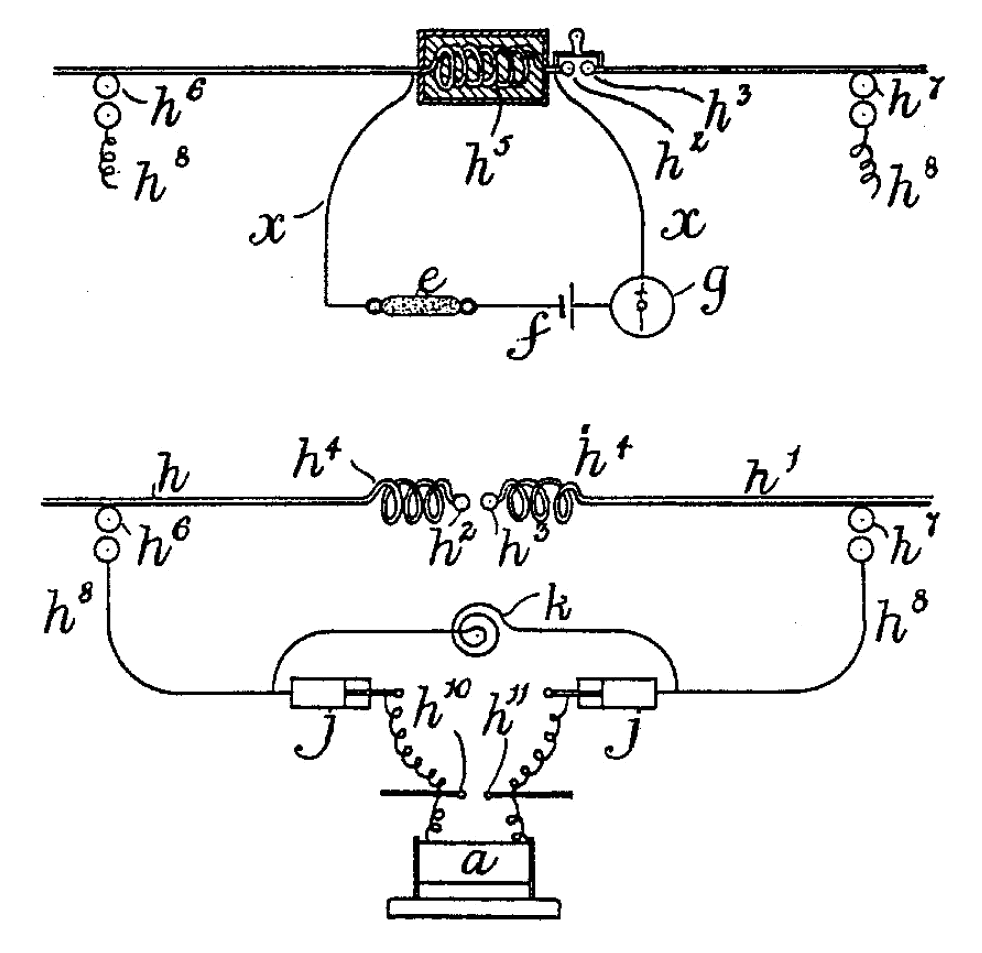
Transmitter (bottom) and receiver (top) of the first "syntonic" radio system, from Lodge's 1897 patent

It became clear that for multiple transmitters to operate, some system of "selective signaling" had to be devised to allow a receiver to select which transmitter's signal to receive, and reject the others. In 1892 William Crookes had given an influential lecture on radio in which he suggested using resonance (then called syntony) to reduce the bandwidth of transmitters and receivers. Using a resonant circuit (also called tuned circuit or tank circuit) in transmitters would narrow the bandwidth of the radiated signal, it would occupy a smaller range of frequencies around its center frequency, so that the signals of transmitters "tuned" to transmit on different frequencies would no longer overlap. A receiver which had its own resonant circuit could receive a particular transmitter by "tuning" its resonant frequency to the frequency of the desired transmitter, analogously to the way one musical instrument could be tuned to resonance with another. This is the system used in all modern radio.

During the period 1897 to 1900 wireless researchers realized the advantages of "syntonic" or "tuned" systems, and added capacitors (Leyden jars) and inductors (coils of wire) to transmitters and receivers, to make resonant circuits (tuned circuits, or tank circuits). Oliver Lodge, who had been researching electrical resonance for years, patented the first "syntonic" transmitter and receiver in May 1897 Lodge added an inductor (coil) between the sides of his dipole antennas, which resonated with the capacitance of the antenna to make a tuned circuit. Although his complicated circuit did not see much practical use, Lodge's "syntonic" patent was important because it was the first to propose a radio transmitter and receiver containing resonant circuits which were tuned to resonance with each other. In 1911 when the patent was renewed the Marconi Company was forced to buy it to protect its own syntonic system against infringement suits.

The resonant circuit functioned analogously to a tuning fork, storing oscillating electrical energy, increasing the Q factor of the circuit so the oscillations were less damped. Another advantage was the frequency of the transmitter was no longer determined by the length of the antenna but by the resonant circuit, so it could easily be changed by adjustable taps on the coil. The antenna was brought into resonance with the tuned circuit using loading coils. The energy in each spark, and thus the power output, was no longer limited by the capacitance of the antenna but by the size of the capacitor in the resonant circuit. In order to increase the power very large capacitor banks were used. The form that the resonant circuit took in practical transmitters was the inductively-coupled circuit described in the next section.

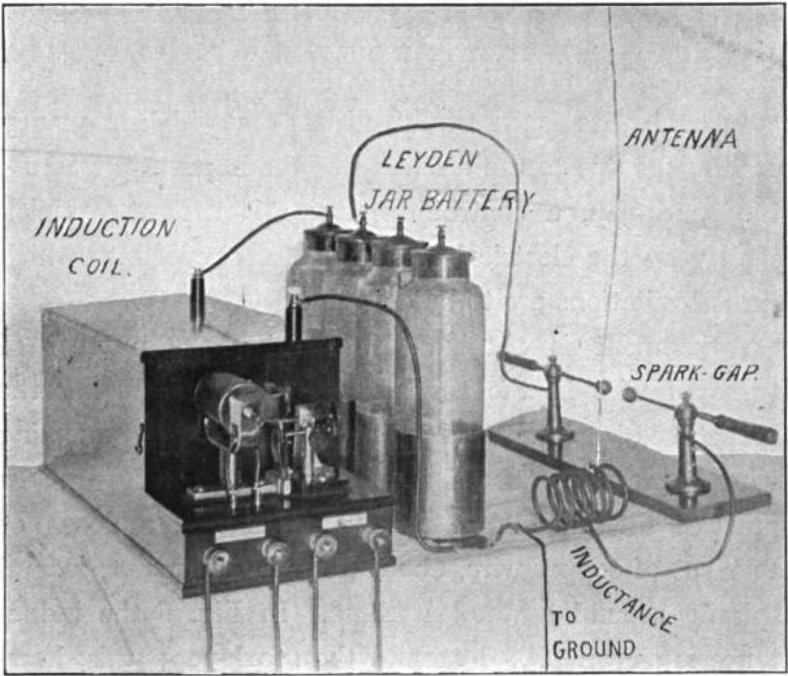
Demonstration inductively coupled spark transmitter 1909, with parts labeled

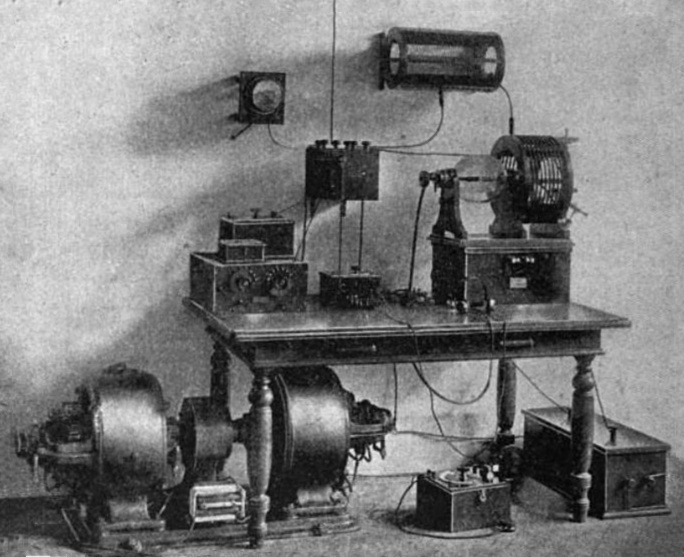
Amateur inductively coupled spark transmitter and receiver, 1910. The spark gap is in glass bulb (center right) next to tuning coil, on top of box containing glass plate capacitor

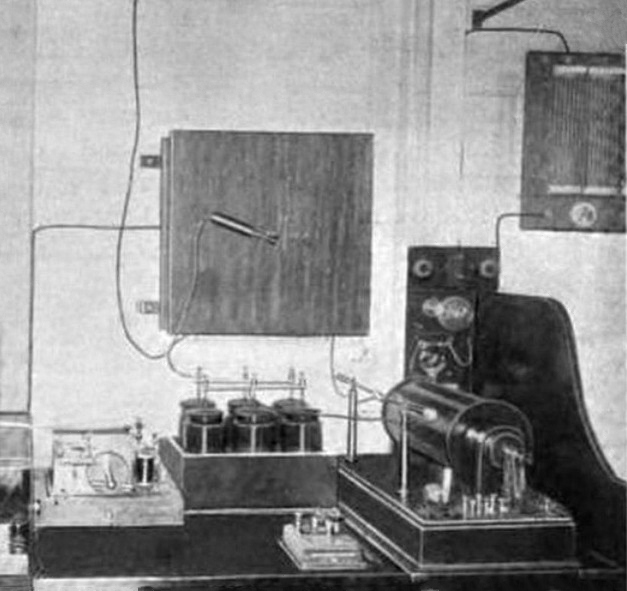
Standard Marconi inductively coupled transmitter on ship 1902. Spark gap is in front of induction coil, lower right. The spiral oscillation transformer is in the wooden box on the wall above the Leyden jars.

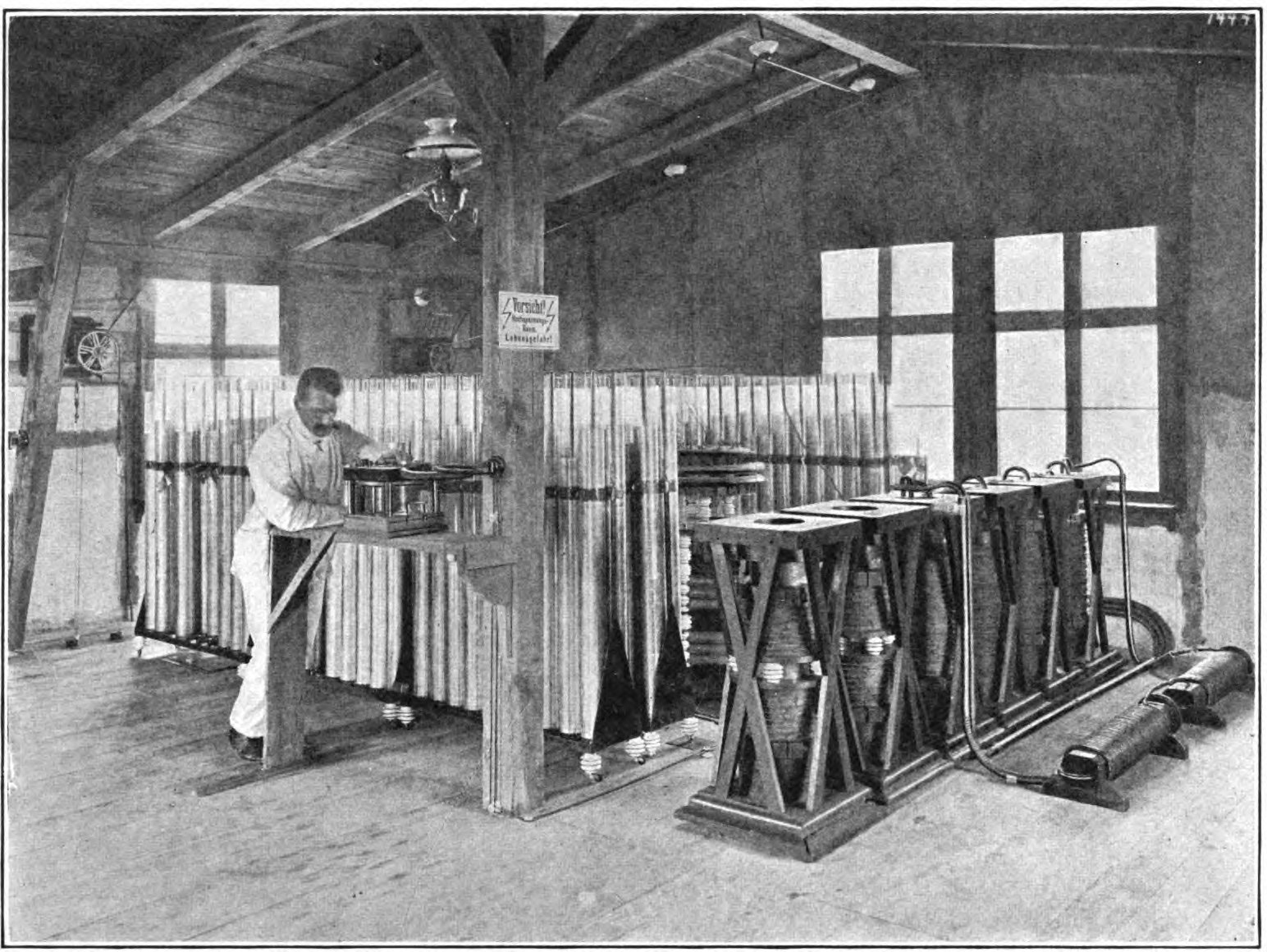
Telefunken 25 kW long distance transmitter built 1906 at Nauen Transmitter Station, Nauen, Germany, showing large 360 Leyden jar 400 μF capacitor bank (rear) and vertical spark gaps (right)

==== Inductive coupling ====
In developing these syntonic transmitters, researchers found it impossible to achieve low damping with a single resonant circuit. A resonant circuit can only have low damping (high Q, narrow bandwidth) if it is a "closed" circuit, with no energy dissipating components. But such a circuit does not produce radio waves. A resonant circuit with an antenna radiating radio waves (an "open" tuned circuit) loses energy quickly, giving it high damping (low Q, wide bandwidth). There was a fundamental tradeoff between a circuit which produced persistent oscillations which had narrow bandwidth, and one which radiated high power.

Inductively coupled spark transmitter. C2 is not an actual capacitor but represents the capacitance between the antenna A and ground.

The solution found by a number of researchers was to use two resonant circuits in the transmitter, with their coils inductively (magnetically) coupled, making a resonant transformer (called an oscillation transformer); this was called an "inductively coupled", "coupled circuit" or "two circuit" transmitter. See circuit diagram. The primary winding of the oscillation transformer (L1) with the capacitor (C1) and spark gap (S) formed a "closed" resonant circuit which generated the oscillations, while the secondary winding (L2) was connected to the wire antenna (A) and ground, forming an "open" resonant circuit with the capacitance of the antenna (C2). Both circuits were tuned to the same resonant frequency. The advantage of the inductively coupled circuit was that the "loosely coupled" transformer transferred the oscillating energy of the tank circuit to the radiating antenna circuit gradually, creating long "ringing" waves. A second advantage was that it allowed a large primary capacitance (C1) to be used which could store a lot of energy, increasing the power output enormously. Powerful transoceanic transmitters often had huge Leyden jar capacitor banks filling rooms (see pictures above). The receiver in most systems also used two inductively coupled circuits, with the antenna an "open" resonant circuit coupled through an oscillation transformer to a "closed" resonant circuit containing the detector. A radio system with a "two circuit" (inductively coupled) transmitter and receiver was called a "four circuit" system.

The first person to use resonant circuits in a radio application was Nikola Tesla, who invented the resonant transformer in 1891. At a March 1893 St. Louis lecture he had demonstrated a wireless system that, although it was intended for wireless power transmission, had many of the elements of later radio communication systems. A grounded capacitance-loaded spark-excited resonant transformer (his Tesla coil) attached to an elevated wire monopole antenna transmitted radio waves, which were received across the room by a similar wire antenna attached to a receiver consisting of a second grounded resonant transformer tuned to the transmitter's frequency, which lighted a Geissler tube. This system, patented by Tesla 2 September 1897, 4 months after Lodge's "syntonic" patent, was in effect an inductively coupled radio transmitter and receiver, the first use of the "four circuit" system claimed by Marconi in his 1900 patent (below). However, Tesla was mainly interested in wireless power and never developed a practical radio communication system.

In addition to Tesla's system, inductively coupled radio systems were patented by Oliver Lodge in February 1898, Karl Ferdinand Braun, in November 1899, and John Stone Stone in February 1900. Braun made the crucial discovery that low damping required "loose coupling" (reduced mutual inductance) between the primary and secondary coils.

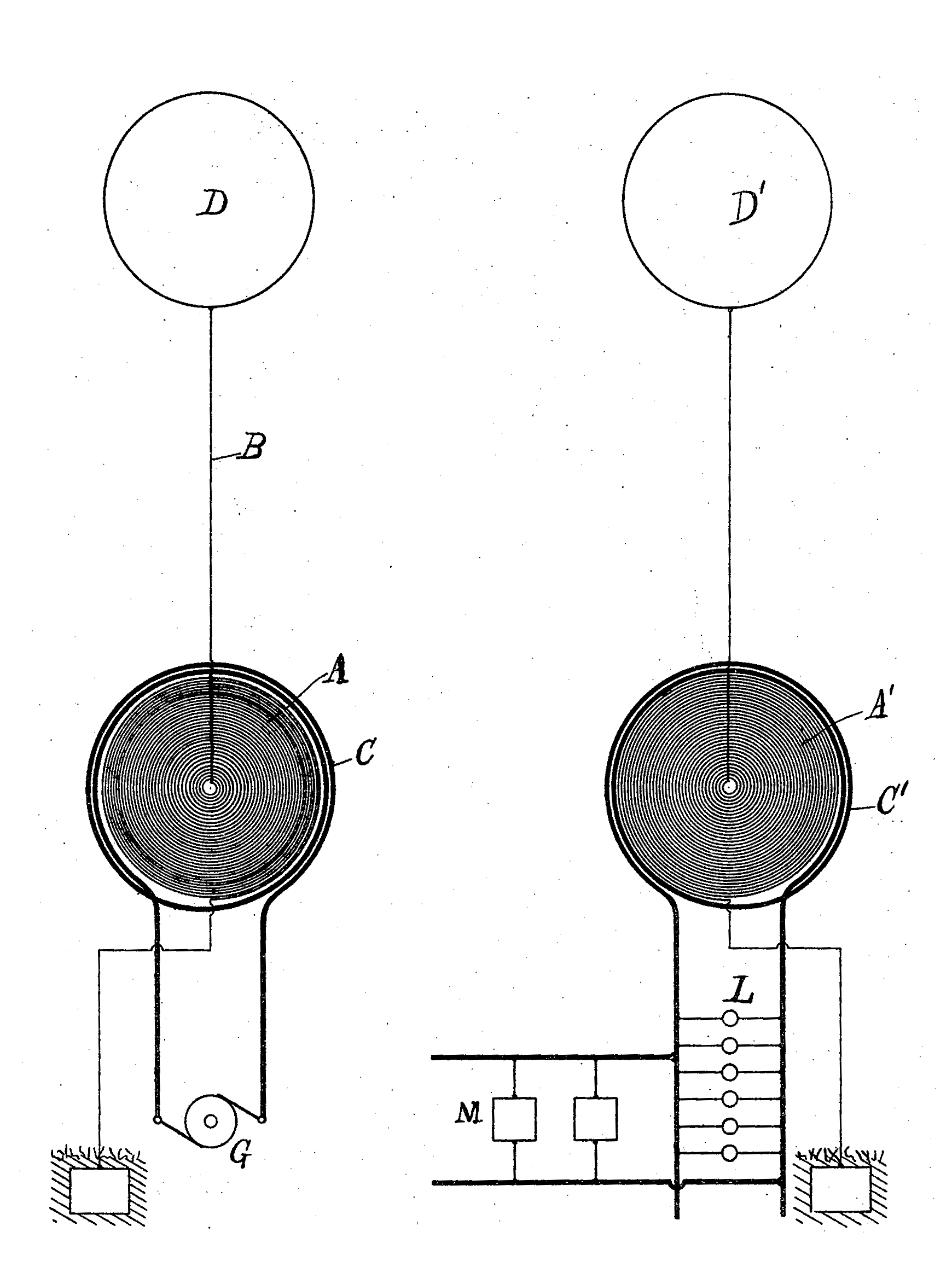
Tesla's inductively coupled power transmitter (left) patented 2 September 1897

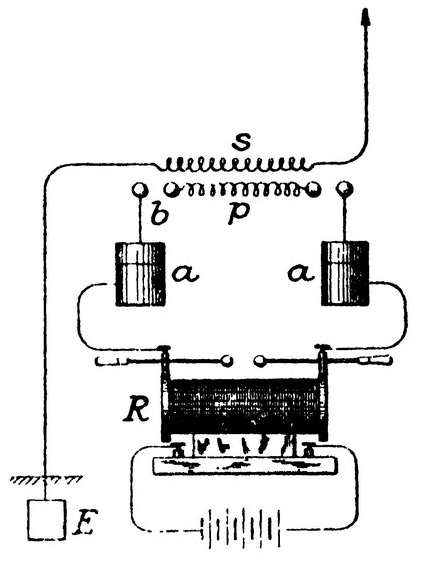
Braun's inductively coupled transmitter patented 3 November 1899

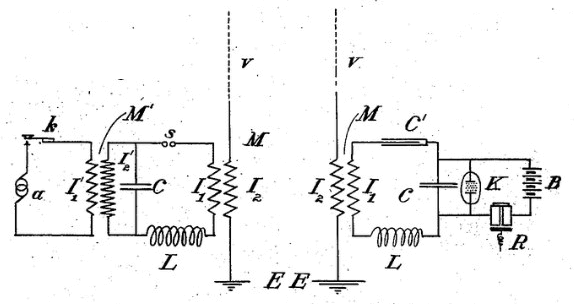
Stone's inductively coupled transmitter (left) and receiver (right) patented 8 February 1900

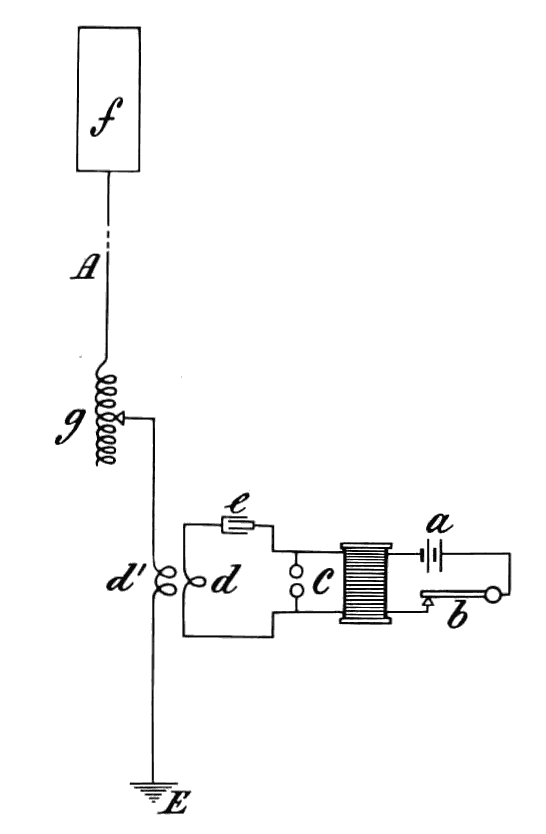
Marconi's inductively coupled transmitter patented 26 April 1900.

Marconi at first paid little attention to syntony, but by 1900 developed a radio system incorporating features from these systems, with a two circuit transmitter and two circuit receiver, with all four circuits tuned to the same frequency, using a resonant transformer he called the "jigger". In spite of the above prior patents, Marconi in his 26 April 1900 "four circuit" or "master tuning" patent on his system claimed rights to the inductively coupled transmitter and receiver. This was granted a British patent, but the US patent office twice rejected his patent as lacking originality. Then in a 1904 appeal a new patent commissioner reversed the decision and granted the patent, on the narrow grounds that Marconi's patent by including an antenna loading coil (J in circuit above) provided the means for tuning the four circuits to the same frequency, whereas in the Tesla and Stone patents this was done by adjusting the length of the antenna. This patent gave Marconi a near monopoly of syntonic wireless telegraphy in England and America. Tesla sued Marconi's company for patent infringement but didn't have the resources to pursue the action. In 1943 the US Supreme Court invalidated the inductive coupling claims of Marconi's patent due to the prior patents of Lodge, Tesla, and Stone, but this came long after spark transmitters had become obsolete.

The inductively coupled or "syntonic" spark transmitter was the first type that could communicate at intercontinental distances, and also the first that had sufficiently narrow bandwidth that interference between transmitters was reduced to a tolerable level. It became the dominant type used during the "spark" era. A drawback of the plain inductively coupled transmitter was that unless the primary and secondary coils were very loosely coupled it radiated on two frequencies. This was remedied by the quenched-spark and rotary gap transmitters (below).

In recognition of their achievements in radio, Marconi and Braun shared the 1909 Nobel Prize in physics.

=== First transatlantic radio transmission ===
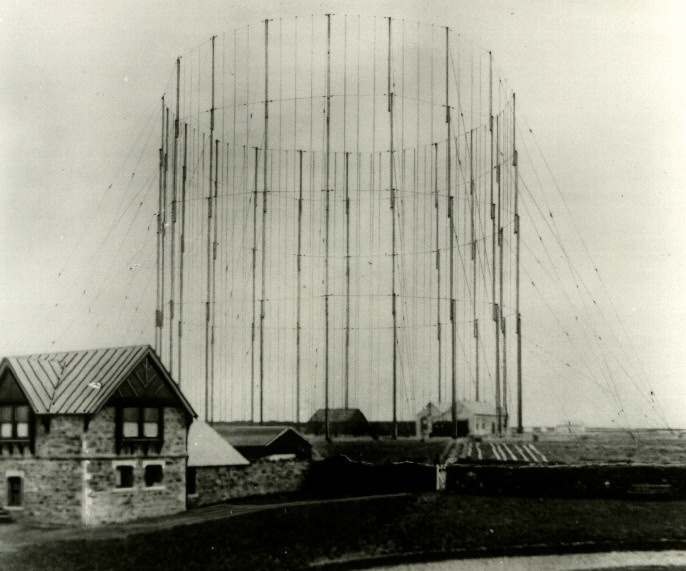
Marconi's transmitting station at Poldhu, Cornwall, showing the original 400-wire vertical inverted cone aerial which collapsed

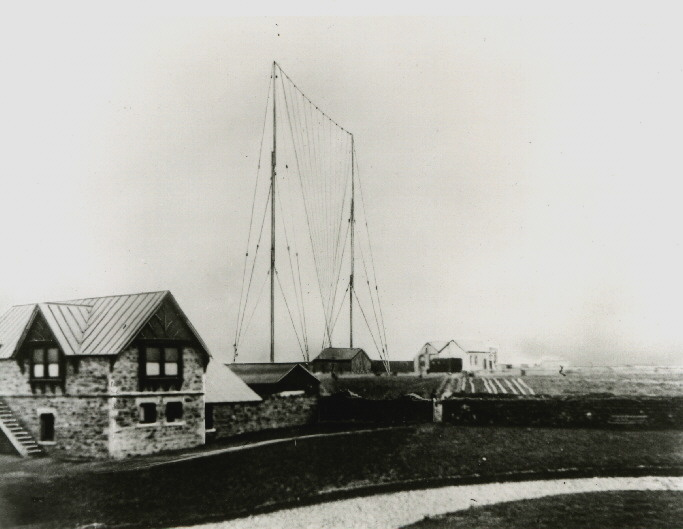
The temporary antenna used in the transatlantic transmission, a fan-shaped 50-wire aerial.

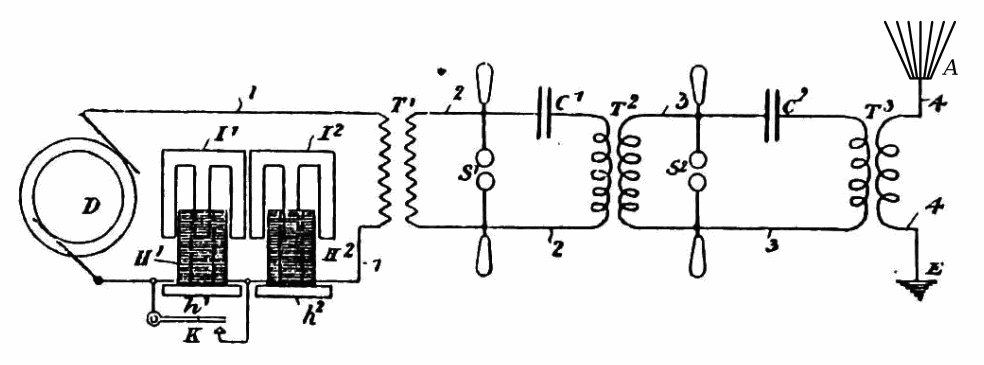
Circuit of Poldhu transmitter. Fleming's curious dual spark gap design was not used in subsequent transmitters.

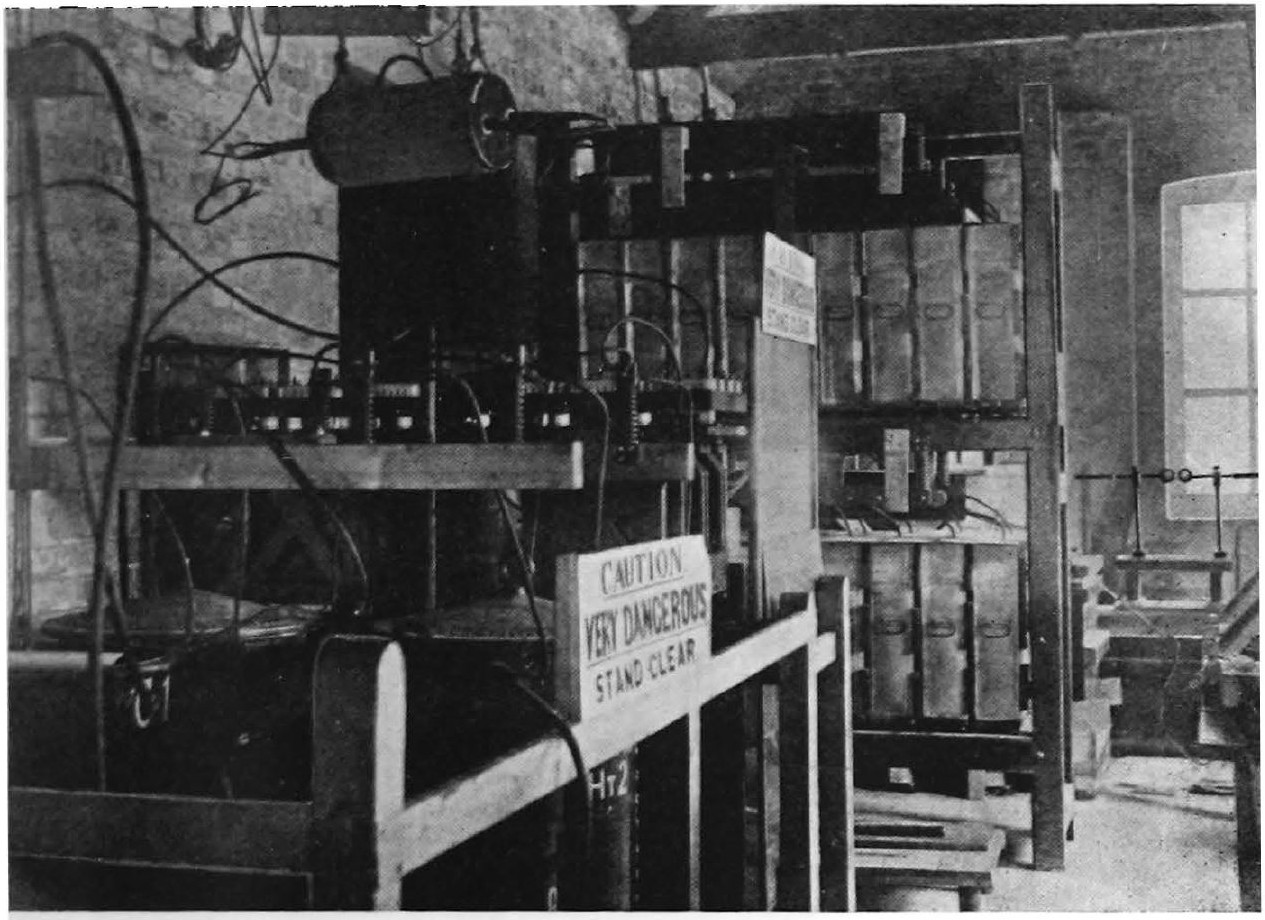
View of Poldhu transmitter

Marconi decided in 1900 to attempt transatlantic communication, which would allow him to dominate Atlantic shipping and compete with submarine telegraph cables. This would require a major scale-up in power, a risky gamble for his company. Up to that time his small induction coil transmitters had an input power of 100 - 200 watts, and the maximum range achieved was around 150 miles. To build the first high power transmitter, Marconi hired an expert in electric power engineering, Prof. John Ambrose Fleming of University College, London, who applied power engineering principles. Fleming designed a complicated inductively-coupled transmitter (see circuit) with two cascaded spark gaps (S1, S2) firing at different rates, and three resonant circuits, powered by a 25 kW alternator (D) turned by a combustion engine. The first spark gap and resonant circuit (S1, C1, T2) generated the high voltage to charge the capacitor (C2) powering the second spark gap and resonant circuit (S2, C2, T3), which generated the output. The spark rate was low, perhaps as low as 2 - 3 sparks per second. Fleming estimated the radiated power was around 10 - 12 kW.

The transmitter was built in secrecy on the coast at Poldhu, Cornwall, UK. Marconi was pressed for time because Nikola Tesla was building his own transatlantic radiotelegraphy transmitter on Long Island, New York, in a bid to be first (this was the Wardenclyffe Tower, which lost funding and was abandoned unfinished after Marconi's success). Marconi's original round 400-wire transmitting antenna collapsed in a storm 17 September 1901 and he hastily erected a temporary antenna consisting of 50 wires suspended in a fan shape from a cable between two 160 foot poles. The frequency used is not known precisely, as Marconi did not measure wavelength or frequency, but it was between 166 and 984 kHz, probably around 500 kHz. He received the signal on the coast of St. John's, Newfoundland using an untuned coherer receiver with a 400 ft. wire antenna suspended from a kite. Marconi announced the first transatlantic radio transmission took place on 12 December 1901, from Poldhu, Cornwall to Signal Hill, Newfoundland, a distance of 2100 miles (3400 km).

Marconi's achievement received worldwide publicity, and was the final proof that radio was a practical communication technology. The scientific community at first doubted Marconi's report. Virtually all wireless experts besides Marconi believed that radio waves traveled in straight lines, so no one (including Marconi) understood how the waves had managed to propagate around the 300 mile high curve of the Earth between Britain and Newfoundland. In 1902 Arthur Kennelly and Oliver Heaviside independently theorized that radio waves were reflected by a layer of ionized atoms in the upper atmosphere, enabling them to return to Earth beyond the horizon. In 1924 Edward V. Appleton demonstrated the existence of this layer, now called the "Kennelly–Heaviside layer" or "E-layer", for which he received the 1947 Nobel Prize in Physics.

Knowledgeable sources today doubt whether Marconi actually received this transmission. Ionospheric conditions should not have allowed the signal to be received during the daytime at that range. Marconi knew the Morse code signal to be transmitted was the letter 'S' (three dots). He and his assistant could have mistaken atmospheric radio noise ("static") in their earphones for the clicks of the transmitter. Marconi made many subsequent transatlantic transmissions which clearly establish his priority, but reliable transatlantic communication was not achieved until 1907 with more powerful transmitters.

=== Quenched-spark transmitters ===
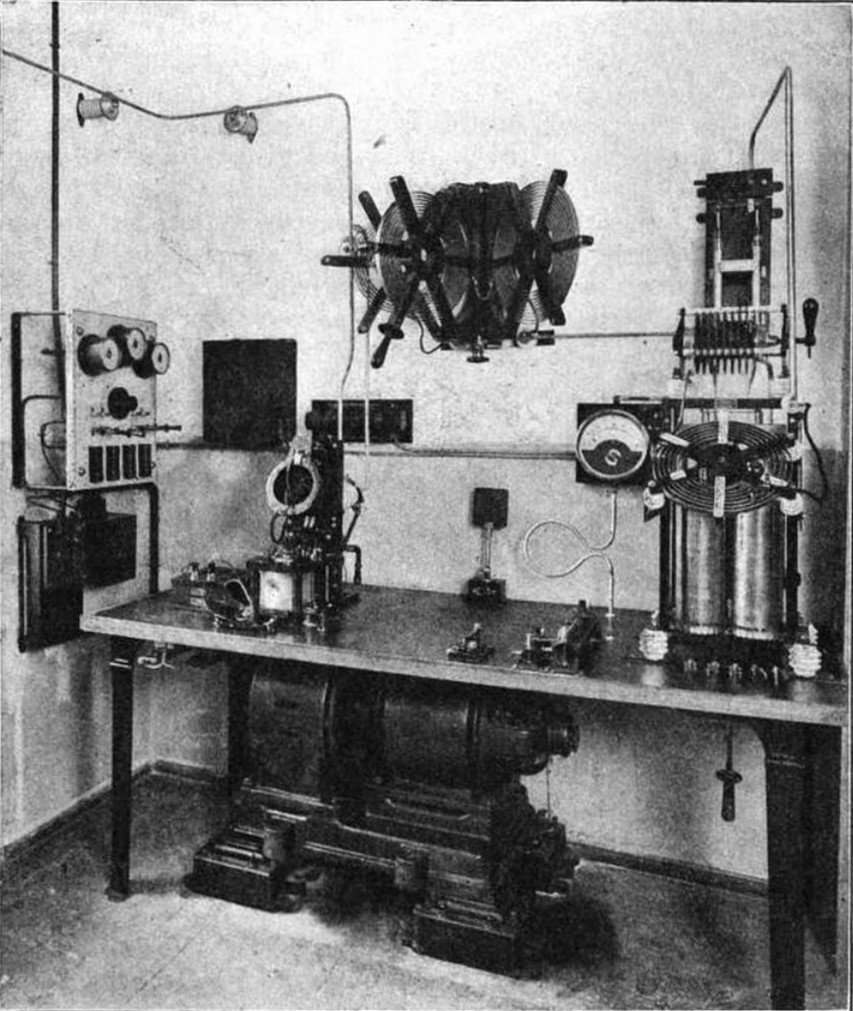
Ship radio room with 1.5 kW Telefunken quenched-spark transmitter

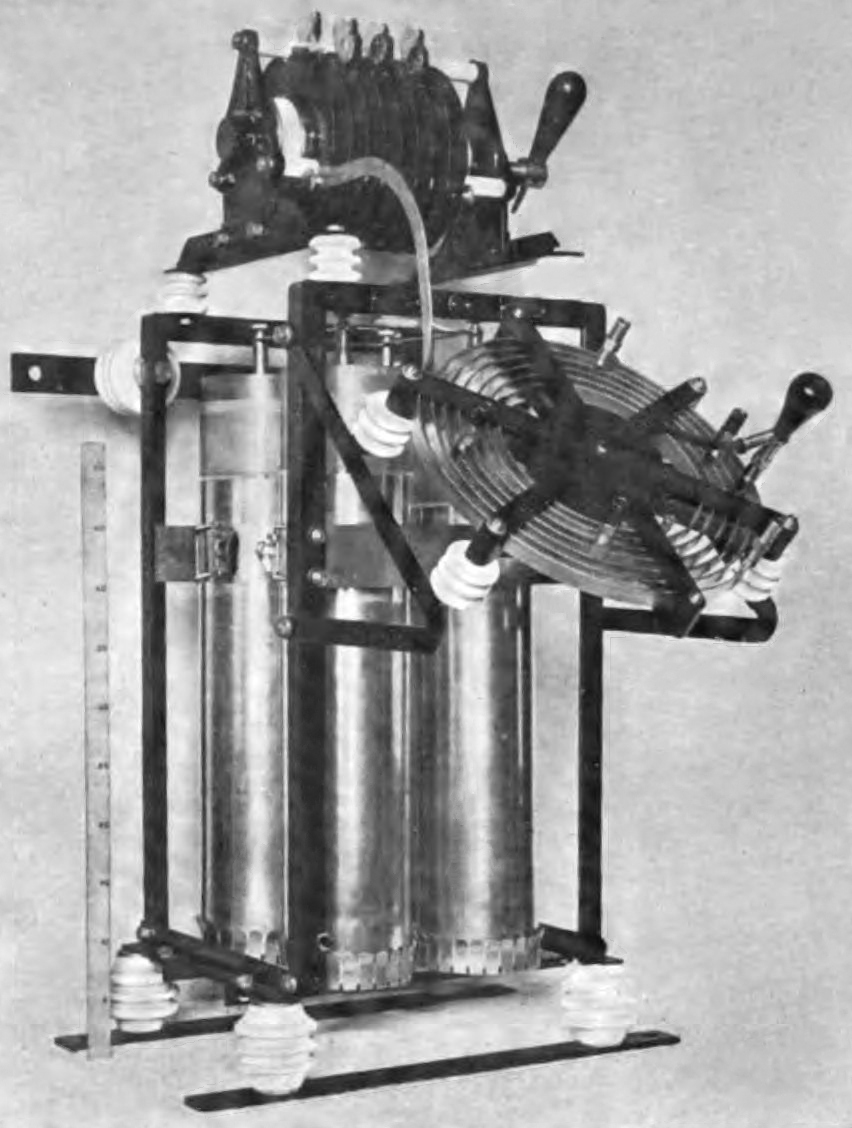
Tuned circuit of transmitter. (top) quenched gap, (center) oscillation transformer, Leyden jars

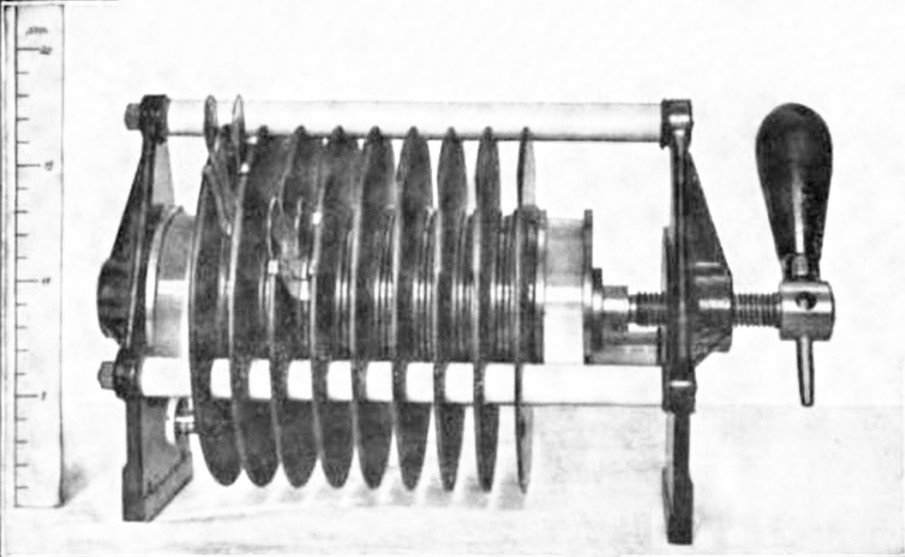
Quenched spark gap from transmitter, left. The handle turns a screw which puts pressure on the stack of cylindrical electrodes, allowing the gap widths to be adjusted.

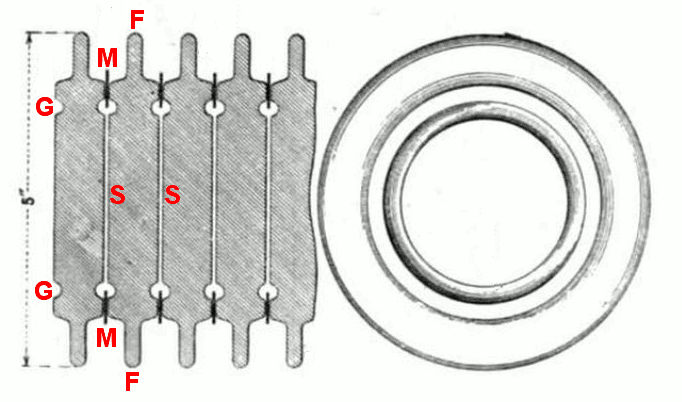
Cross section of portion of quenched spark gap, consisting of metal disks (F) separated by thin insulating mica washers (M) to make multiple microscopic spark gaps (S) in series

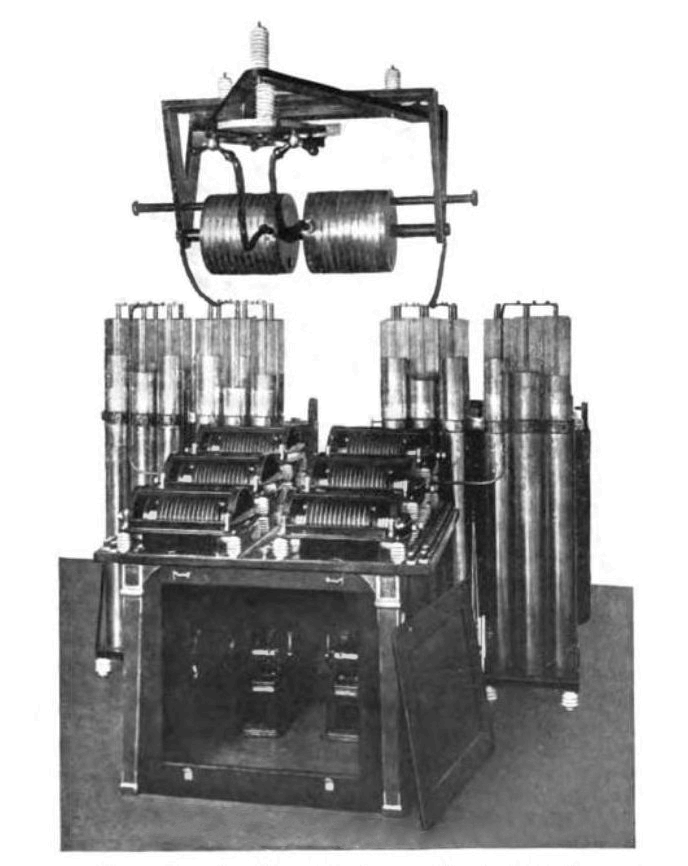
A powerful quenched-spark transmitter in Australia. The 6 cylinders in front of the Leyden jars are the quenched spark gaps.

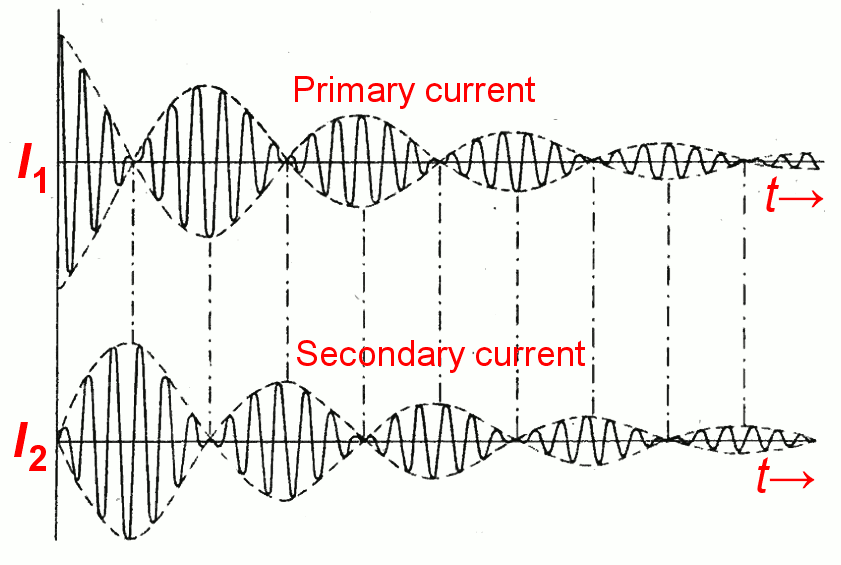
Ordinary inductively coupled transmitter

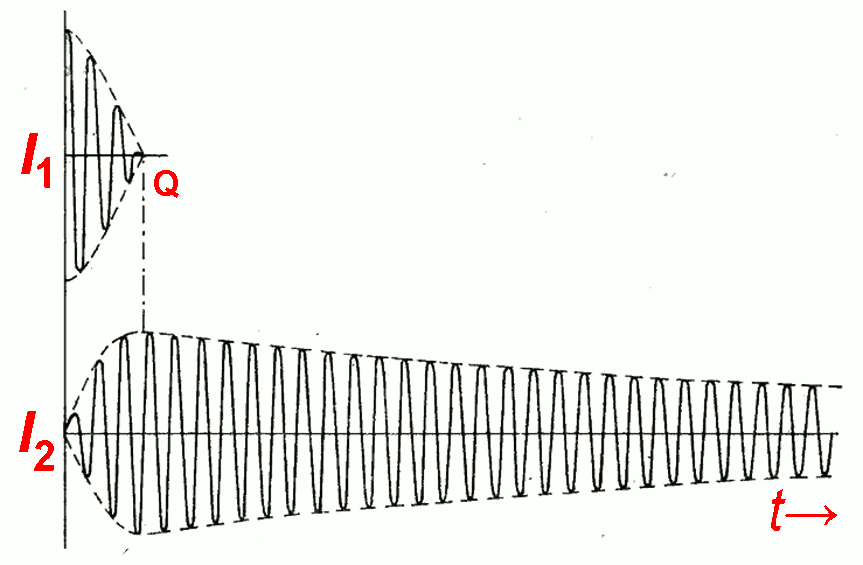
Quenched-spark transmitter

The inductively-coupled transmitter had a more complicated output waveform than the non-syntonic transmitter, due to the interaction of the two resonant circuits. The two magnetically coupled tuned circuits acted as a coupled oscillator, producing beats (see top graphs). The oscillating radio frequency energy was passed rapidly back and forth between the primary and secondary resonant circuits as long as the spark continued. Each time the energy returned to the primary, some was lost as heat in the spark. In addition, unless the coupling was very loose the oscillations caused the transmitter to transmit on two separate frequencies. Since the narrow passband of the receiver's resonant circuit could only be tuned to one of these frequencies, the power radiated at the other frequency was wasted.

This troublesome backflow of energy to the primary circuit could be prevented by extinguishing (quenching) the spark at the right instant, after all the energy from the capacitors was transferred to the antenna circuit. Inventors tried various methods to accomplish this, such as air blasts and Elihu Thomson's magnetic blowout.

In 1906, a new type of spark gap was developed by German engineer Egbert von Lepel and German physicist Max Wien, called the series or quenched gap. A quenched gap consisted of a stack of wide cylindrical electrodes separated by thin insulating spacer rings to create many narrow spark gaps in series, of around 0.1–0.3 mm (0.004–0.01 in). The wide surface area of the electrodes terminated the ionization in the gap quickly by cooling it after the current stopped. In the inductively coupled transmitter, the narrow gaps extinguished ("quenched") the spark at the first nodal point (Q) when the primary current momentarily went to zero after all the energy had been transferred to the secondary winding (see lower graph). Since without the spark no current could flow in the primary circuit, this effectively uncoupled the secondary from the primary circuit, allowing the secondary resonant circuit and antenna to oscillate completely free of the primary circuit after that (until the next spark). This produced output power centered on a single frequency instead of two frequencies. It also eliminated most of the energy loss in the spark, producing very lightly damped, long "ringing" waves, with decrements of only 0.08 to 0.25 (a Q of 12-38) and consequently a very "pure", narrow bandwidth radio signal. Another advantage was the rapid quenching allowed the time between sparks to be reduced, allowing higher spark rates of around 1000 Hz to be used, which had a musical tone in the receiver which penetrated radio static better. The quenched gap transmitter was called the "singing spark" system.

The German wireless giant Telefunken Co., Marconi's rival, acquired the patent rights and used the quenched spark gap in their transmitters.

=== Rotary gap transmitters ===
A second type of spark gap that had a similar quenching effect was the "rotary gap", invented by Tesla in 1896 and applied to radio transmitters by Reginald Fessenden and others. It consisted of multiple electrodes equally spaced around a disk rotor spun at high speed by a motor, which created sparks as they passed by a stationary electrode. By using the correct motor speed, the rapidly separating electrodes extinguished the spark after the energy had been transferred to the secondary. The rotating wheel also kept the electrodes cooler, important in high-power transmitters.

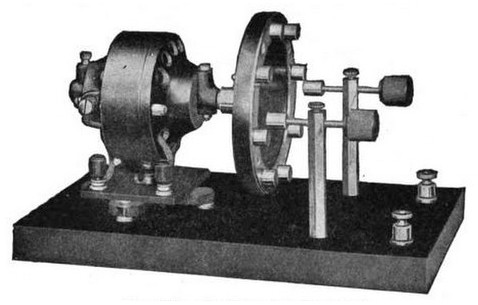
A typical rotary spark gap used in low-power transmitters

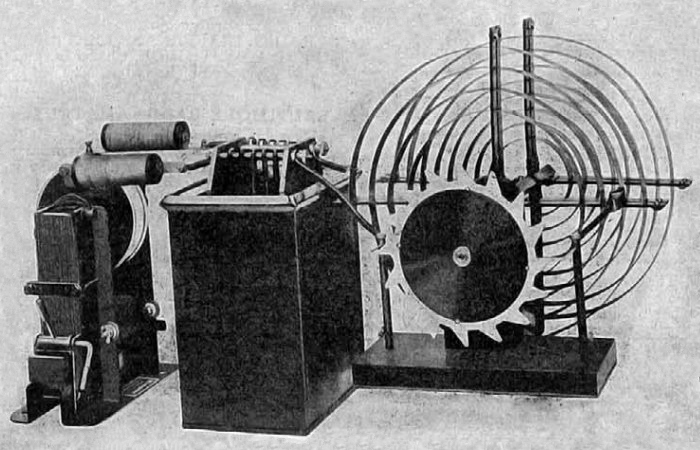
Small rotary spark transmitter, 1918

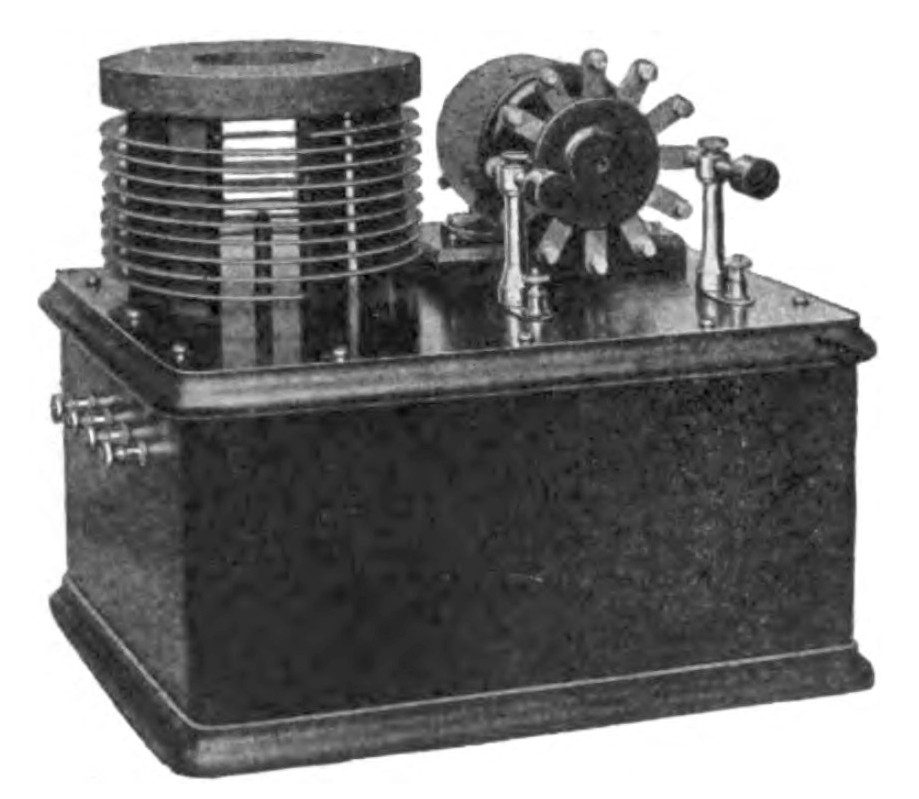
1 kilowatt rotary spark transmitter, 1914.

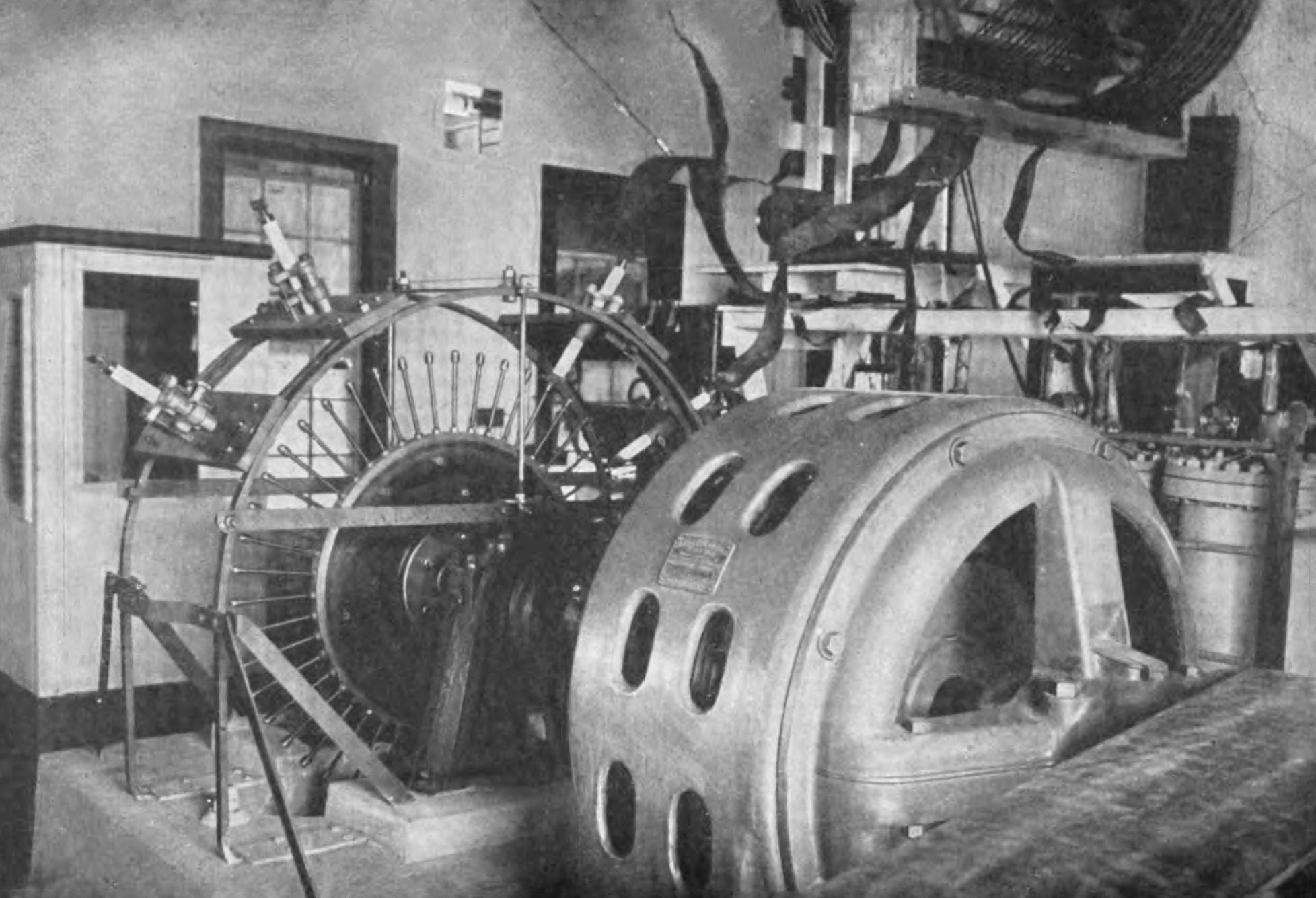
Fessenden's 35 kW synchronous rotary spark transmitter, built 1905 at Brant Rock, Massachusetts, with which he achieved the first 2 way transatlantic communication in 1906 on 88 kHz.

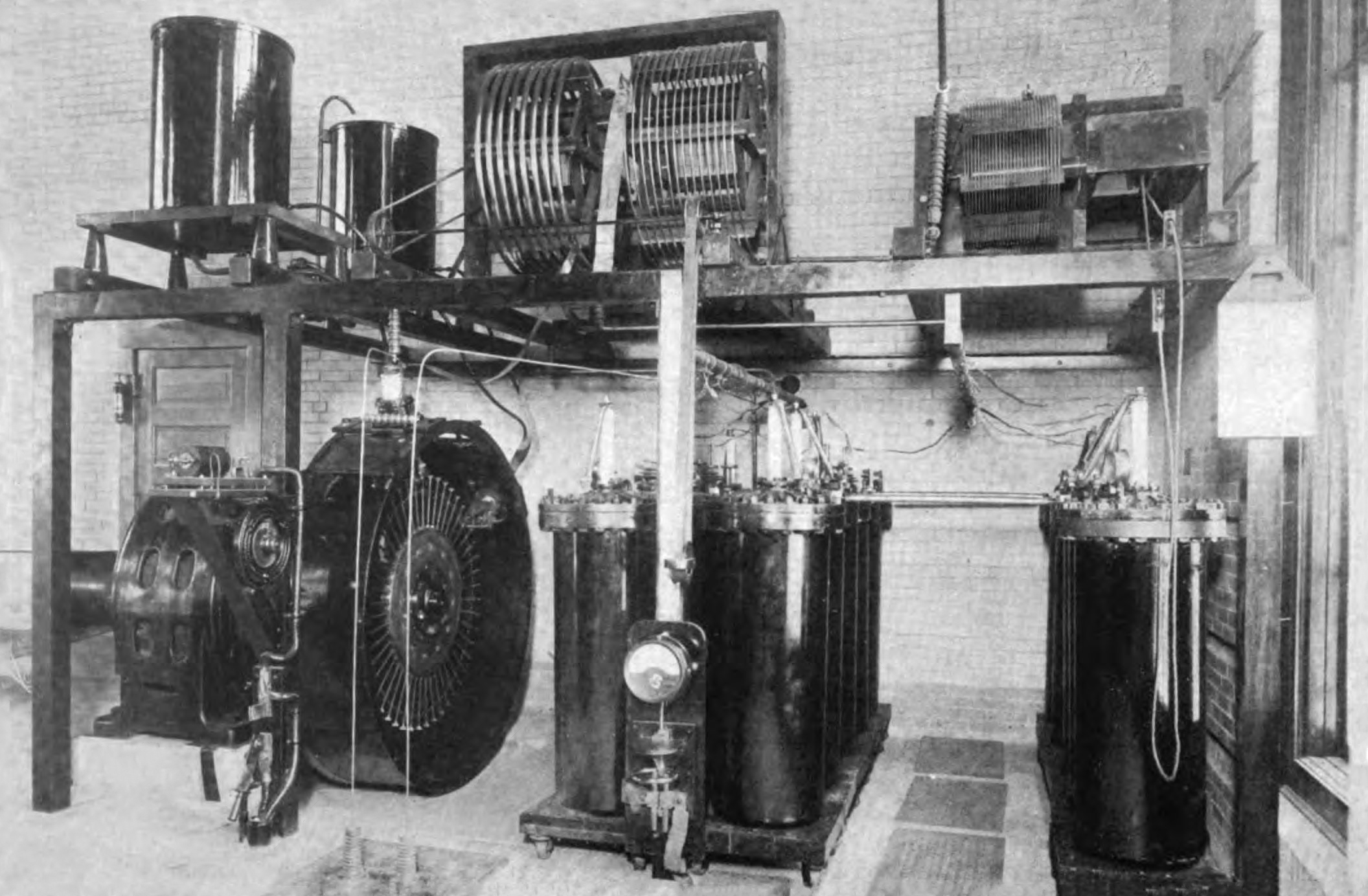
US Navy 100 kW rotary gap transmitter built by Fessenden in 1913 at Arlington, Virginia. It transmitted on 113 kHz to Europe, and broadcast the US's first radio time signal.

There were two types of rotary spark transmitter:

- Nonsynchronous: In the earlier rotary gaps, the motor was not synchronized with the frequency of the AC transformer, so the spark occurred at random times in the AC cycle of the voltage applied to the capacitor. The problem with this was the interval between the sparks was not constant. The voltage on the capacitor when a moving electrode approached the stationary electrode varied randomly between zero and the peak AC voltage. The exact time when the spark started varied depending on the gap length the spark could jump, which depended on the voltage. The resulting random phase variation of successive damped waves resulted in a signal that had a "hissing" or "rasping" sound in the receiver.
- Synchronous: In this type, invented by Fessenden around 1904, the rotor was turned by a synchronous motor in synchronism with the cycles of the AC voltage to the transformer, so the spark occurred at the same points of the voltage sine wave each cycle. Usually it was designed so there was one spark each half cycle, adjusted so the spark occurred at the peak voltage when the capacitor was fully charged. Thus the spark had a steady frequency equal to a multiple of the AC line frequency, which created harmonics with the line frequency. The synchronous gap was said to produce a more musical, easily heard tone in the receiver, which cut through interference better.

To reduce interference caused by the "noisy" signals of the burgeoning numbers of spark transmitters, the 1912 US Congress "Act to Regulate Radio Communication" required that "the logarithmic decrement per oscillation in the wave trains emitted by the transmitter shall not exceed two tenths" (this is equivalent to a Q factor of 15 or greater). Virtually the only spark transmitters which could satisfy this condition were the quenched-spark and rotary gap types above, and they dominated wireless telegraphy for the rest of the spark era.

==== Marconi's timed spark system ====
In 1912 in his high-power stations Marconi developed a refinement of the rotary discharger called the "timed spark" system, which generated what was probably the nearest to a continuous wave that sparks could produce. He used several identical resonant circuits in parallel, with the capacitors charged by a DC dynamo. These were discharged sequentially by multiple rotary discharger wheels on the same shaft to create overlapping damped waves shifted progressively in time, which were added together in the oscillation transformer so the output was a superposition of damped waves. The speed of the discharger wheel was controlled so that the time between sparks was equal to an integer multiple of the wave period. Therefore, oscillations of the successive wave trains were in phase and reinforced each other. The result was essentially a continuous sinusoidal wave, whose amplitude varied with a ripple at the spark rate. This system was necessary to give Marconi's transoceanic stations a narrow enough bandwidth that they didn't interfere with other transmitters on the narrow VLF band. Timed spark transmitters achieved the longest transmission range of any spark transmitters, but these behemoths represented the end of spark technology.

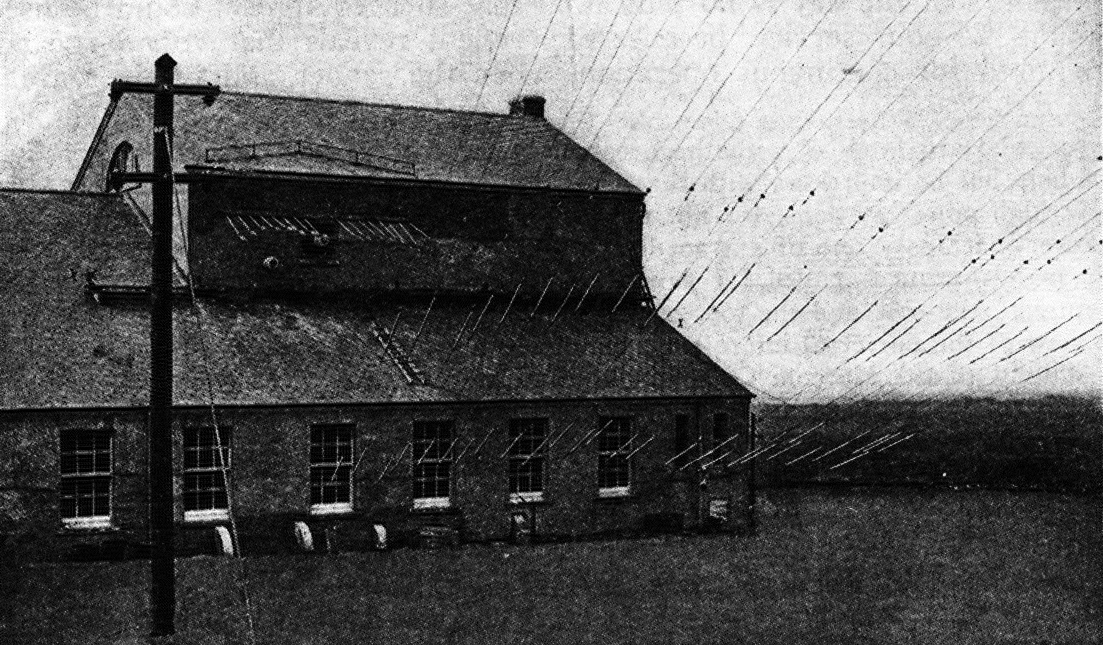
Transmitter building, showing the 36 feedlines feeding power to the 3,600 ft. flattop wire antenna.

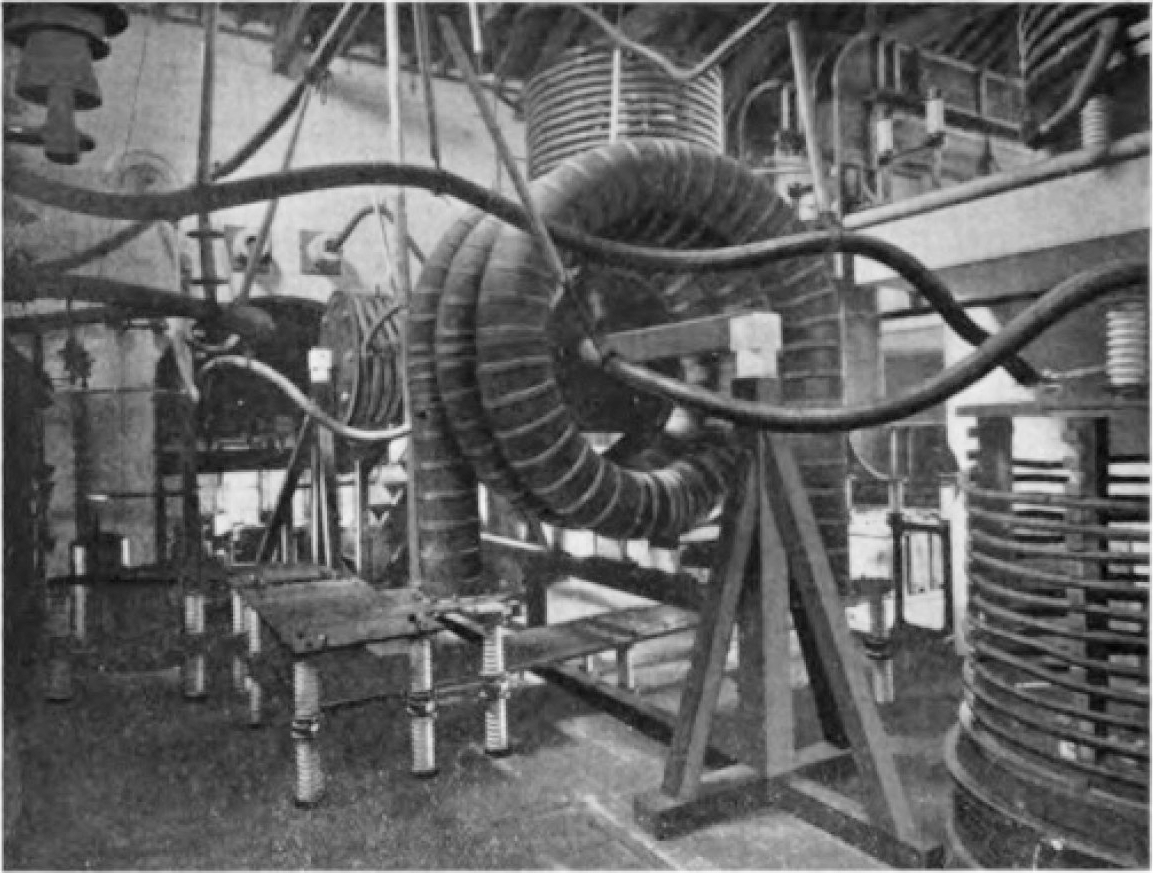
5 ft diameter primary coil of oscillation transformer, consisting of 3 turns of specialized litz wire one foot thick

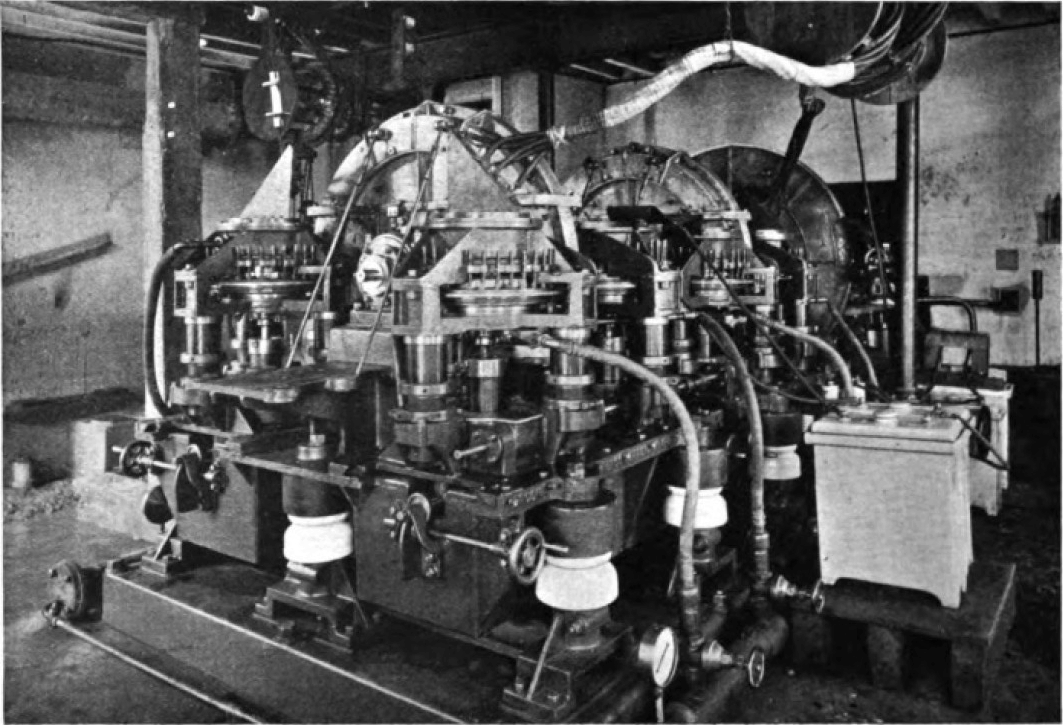
The three 5 ft rotary spark discharger wheels of the "timed spark" system.

Marconi 300 kW transatlantic timed spark transmitter built 1916 at Carnarvon, Wales, one of the most powerful spark transmitters ever built. During World War I it transmitted telegram traffic at 200 words per minute on 21.5 kHz to receivers in Belmar, New Jersey. The roar of the spark could reportedly be heard a kilometer away. On 22 September 1918 it transmitted the first wireless message from Britain to Australia, a distance of 15,200 km (9,439 miles). In 1921 it was replaced by Alexanderson alternator transmitters.

=== The "spark" era ===
The first application of radio was on ships, to keep in touch with shore, and send out a distress call if the ship were sinking. The Marconi Company built a string of shore stations and in 1904 established the first Morse code distress call, the letters CQD, used until the Second International Radiotelegraphic Convention in 1906 at which SOS was agreed on. The first significant marine rescue due to radiotelegraphy was the 23 January 1909 sinking of the luxury liner RMS Republic, in which 1500 people were saved.

Radio frequencies used by spark transmitters during the wireless telegraphy era
Uses	Frequency (kilohertz)	Wavelength (meters)	Typical power range (kW)
Amateur	> 1500	< 200	0.25 - 0.5
Ships	500, 660, 1000	600, 450, 300	1 - 10
Navy	187.5 - 500	1600 - 600	5 - 20
Moderate size land stations	187.5 - 333	1600 - 900	5 - 20
Transoceanic stations	15 - 187.5	20,000 - 1600	20 - 500

Spark transmitters and the crystal receivers used to receive them were simple enough that they were widely built by hobbyists. During the first decades of the 20th century this exciting new high tech hobby attracted a growing community of "radio amateurs", many of them teenage boys, who used their homebuilt sets recreationally to contact distant amateurs and chat with them by Morse code, and relay messages. Low-power amateur transmitters ("squeak boxes") were often built with "trembler" ignition coils from early automobiles such as the Ford Model T. In the US prior to 1912 there was no government regulation of radio, and a chaotic "wild west" atmosphere prevailed, with stations transmitting without regard to other stations on their frequency, and deliberately interfering with each other. The expanding numbers of non-syntonic broadband spark transmitters created uncontrolled congestion in the airwaves, interfering with commercial and military wireless stations.

The sinking of the RMS Titanic on 15 April 1912 increased public appreciation for the role of radio, but the loss of life brought attention to the disorganized state of the new radio industry, and prompted regulation which corrected some abuses. Although the Titanic radio operator's CQD distress calls summoned the RMS Carpathia which rescued 705 survivors, the rescue operation was delayed four hours because the nearest ship, the SS Californian, only a few miles away, did not hear the Titanic's call as its radio operator had gone to bed. This was held responsible for most of the 1500 deaths. Existing international regulations required all ships with more than 50 passengers to carry wireless equipment, but after the disaster subsequent regulations mandated ships have enough radio officers so that a round-the-clock radio watch could be kept. US President Taft and the public heard reports of chaos on the air the night of the disaster, with amateur stations interfering with official naval messages and passing false information. In response Congress passed the 1912 Radio Act, in which licenses were required for all radio transmitters, maximum damping of transmitters was limited to a decrement of 0.2 to get old noisy non-syntonic transmitters off the air, and amateurs were mainly restricted to the unused frequencies above 1.5 MHz and output power of 1 kilowatt.

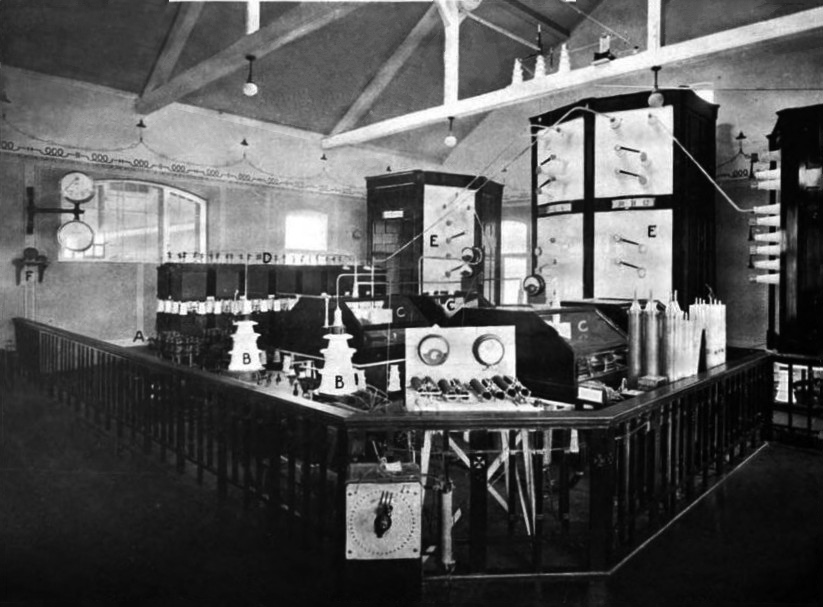
Telefunken 100 kW transoceanic quenched spark transmitter at Nauen Transmitter Station, Nauen, Germany was the most powerful radio transmitter in the world when it was built in 1911

The largest spark transmitters were powerful transoceanic radiotelegraphy stations with input power of 100 - 300 kW. Beginning about 1910, industrial countries built global networks of these stations to exchange commercial and diplomatic telegram traffic with other countries and communicate with their overseas colonies. During World War I, radio became a strategic defensive technology, as it was realized a nation without long distance radiotelegraph stations could be isolated by an enemy cutting its submarine telegraph cables. Most of these networks were built by the two giant wireless corporations of the age: the British Marconi Company, which constructed the Imperial Wireless Chain to link the possessions of the British Empire, and the German Telefunken Co. which was dominant outside the British Empire. Marconi transmitters used the timed spark rotary discharger, while Telefunken transmitters used its quenched spark gap technology. Paper tape machines were used to transmit Morse code text at high speed. To achieve a maximum range of around 6,000 miles (9,700 kilometres) transoceanic stations transmitted mainly in the very low frequency (VLF) band, from 50 kHz to as low as 15 – 20 kHz. At these wavelengths even the largest antennas were electrically short, a tiny fraction of a wavelength tall, and so had low radiation resistance (often below 1 ohm), so these transmitters required enormous wire umbrella and flattop antennas up to several miles long with large capacitive toploads, to achieve adequate efficiency. The antenna required a large loading coil at the base, 6 – 10 feet tall, to make it resonant with the transmitter.

=== Continuous waves ===
Although their damping had been reduced as much as possible, spark transmitters still produced damped waves, which due to their large bandwidth caused interference between transmitters. The spark also made a very loud noise when operating, produced corrosive ozone gas, eroded the spark electrodes, and could be a fire hazard. Despite its drawbacks, most wireless experts believed along with Marconi that the impulsive "whipcrack" of a spark was necessary to produce radio waves that would communicate long distances.

From the beginning, physicists knew that another type of waveform, continuous sinusoidal waves (CW), had theoretical advantages over damped waves for radio transmission. Because their energy is essentially concentrated at a single frequency, in addition to causing almost no interference to other transmitters on adjacent frequencies, continuous wave transmitters could transmit longer distances with a given output power. They could also be modulated with an audio signal to carry sound. The problem was no techniques were known for generating continuous waves. The efforts described above to reduce the damping of spark transmitters can be seen as attempts to make their output approach closer to the ideal of a continuous wave, but spark transmitters could not produce true continuous waves.

Beginning about 1904, continuous wave transmitters were developed using new principles, which competed with spark transmitters. Continuous waves were first generated by two short-lived technologies:

- The arc converter (Poulsen arc) transmitter, invented by Valdemar Poulsen in 1904 used the negative resistance of a continuous electric arc in a hydrogen atmosphere to excite oscillations in a resonant circuit.
- The Alexanderson alternator transmitter, developed between 1906 and 1915 by Reginald Fessenden and Ernst Alexanderson, was a huge rotating alternating current generator (alternator) driven by an electric motor at a high enough speed that it produced radio frequency current in the very low frequency range.

These transmitters, which could produce power outputs of up to one megawatt, slowly replaced the spark transmitter in high-power radiotelegraphy stations. However spark transmitters remained popular in two way communication stations because most continuous wave transmitters were not capable of a mode called "break in" or "listen in" operation. With a spark transmitter, when the telegraph key was up between Morse symbols the carrier wave was turned off and the receiver was turned on, so the operator could listen for an incoming message. This allowed the receiving station, or a third station, to interrupt or "break in" to an ongoing transmission. In contrast, these early CW transmitters had to operate continuously; the carrier wave was not turned off between Morse code symbols, words, or sentences but just detuned, so a local receiver could not operate as long as the transmitter was powered up. Therefore, these stations could not receive messages until the transmitter was turned off.

=== Obsolescence ===
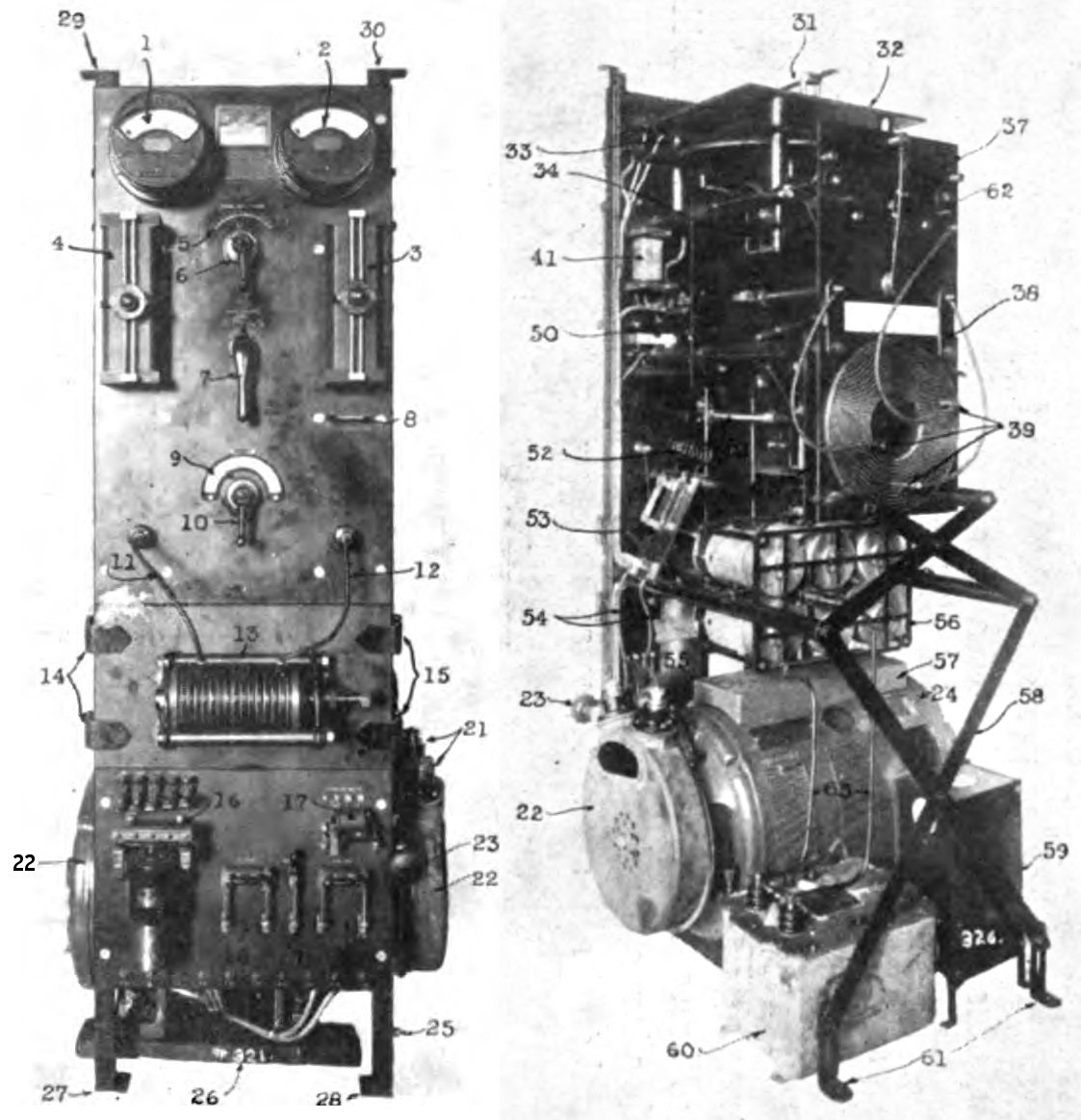
Marconi 2 kilowatt ship spark transmitter, 1920.

All these early technologies were superseded by the vacuum tube feedback electronic oscillator, invented in 1912 by Edwin Armstrong and Alexander Meissner, which used the triode vacuum tube invented in 1906 by Lee de Forest. Vacuum tube oscillators were a far cheaper source of continuous waves, and could be easily modulated to carry sound. Due to the development of the first high-power transmitting tubes by the end of World War I, in the 1920s tube transmitters replaced the arc converter and alternator transmitters, as well as the last of the old noisy spark transmitters.

The 1927 International Radiotelegraph Convention in Washington, D.C. saw a political battle to finally eliminate spark radio. Spark transmitters were obsolete at this point, and broadcast radio audiences and aviation authorities were complaining of the disruption to radio reception that noisy legacy marine spark transmitters were causing. But shipping interests vigorously fought a blanket prohibition on damped waves, due to the capital expenditure that would be required to replace spark equipment that was still being used on older ships. The Convention prohibited licensing of new land spark transmitters after 1929. Damped wave radio emission, called Class B, was banned after 1934 except for emergency use on ships. This loophole allowed shipowners to avoid replacing spark transmitters, which were kept as emergency backup transmitters on ships through World War II.

=== Legacy ===
One legacy of spark-gap transmitters is that radio operators were regularly nicknamed "Sparks" long after the devices ceased to be used. Even today, the German verb funken, literally, "to spark", also means "to send a radio message".

The spark gap oscillator was also used in nonradio applications, continuing long after it became obsolete in radio. In the form of the Tesla coil and Oudin coil it was used until the 1940s in the medical field of diathermy for deep body heating. High oscillating voltages of hundreds of thousands of volts at frequencies of 0.1 - 1 MHz from a Tesla coil were applied directly to the patient's body. The treatment was not painful, because currents in the radio frequency range do not cause the physiological reaction of electric shock. In 1926 William T. Bovie discovered that RF currents applied to a scalpel could cut and cauterize tissue in medical operations, and spark oscillators were used as electrosurgery generators or "Bovies" as late as the 1980s.

In the 1950s a Japanese toy company, Matsudaya, produced a line of cheap remote control toy trucks, boats and robots called Radicon, which used a low-power spark transmitter in the controller as an inexpensive way to produce the radio control signals. The signals were received in the toy by a coherer receiver.

Spark gap oscillators are still used to generate high-frequency high voltage needed to initiate welding arcs in gas tungsten arc welding. Powerful spark gap pulse generators are still used to simulate EMPs.

== See also ==
- History of radio
- Invention of radio
- Amateur radio
- Antique radio
- Coherer
- Crystal radio
