= Invention of radio =

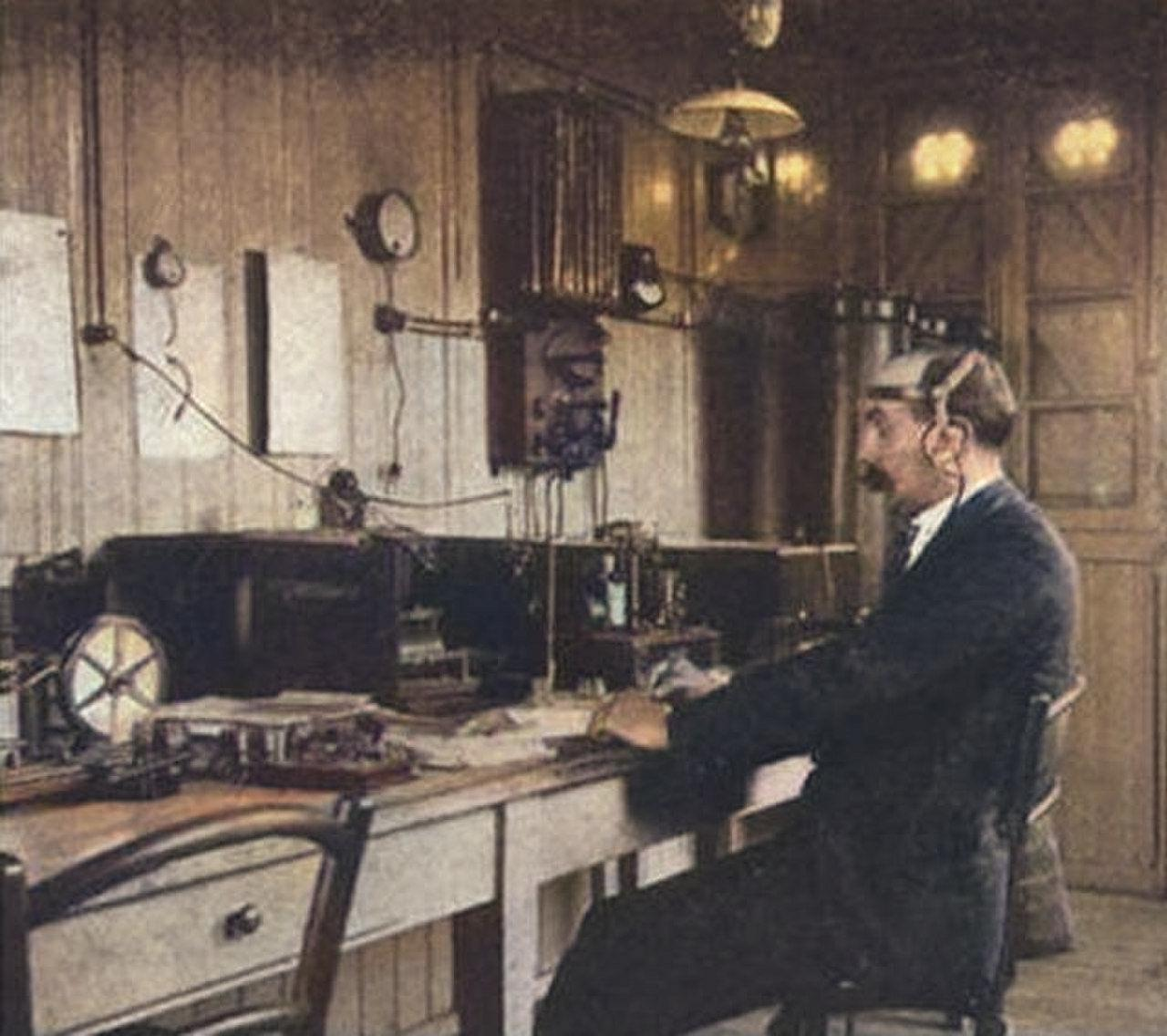
A French ship-to-shore radio station in 1904

The invention of radio communication was preceded by many decades of establishing theoretical underpinnings, discovery and experimental investigation of radio waves, and engineering and technical developments related to their transmission and detection. These developments allowed Guglielmo Marconi to turn radio waves into a wireless communication system.

The idea that the wires needed for electrical telegraph could be eliminated, creating a wireless telegraph, had been around for a while before the establishment of radio-based communication. Inventors attempted to build systems based on electric conduction, electromagnetic induction, or on other theoretical ideas. Several inventors/experimenters came across the phenomenon of radio waves before its existence was proven; it was written off as electromagnetic induction at the time.

The discovery of electromagnetic waves, including radio waves, by Heinrich Hertz in the 1880s came after theoretical development on the connection between electricity and magnetism that started in the early 1800s. This work culminated in a theory of electromagnetic radiation developed by James Clerk Maxwell by 1873, which Hertz demonstrated experimentally. Hertz considered electromagnetic waves to be of little practical value. Other experimenters, such as Oliver Lodge and Jagadish Chandra Bose, explored the physical properties of electromagnetic waves, and they developed electric devices and methods to improve the transmission and detection of electromagnetic waves. But they did not apparently see the value in developing a communication system based on electromagnetic waves.

In the mid-1890s, building on techniques physicists were using to study electromagnetic waves, Guglielmo Marconi developed the first apparatus for long-distance radio communication. On 23 December 1900, the Canadian-born American inventor Reginald A. Fessenden became the first person to send audio (wireless telephony) by means of electromagnetic waves, successfully transmitting over a distance of about a mile (1.6 kilometers,) and six years later on Christmas Eve 1906 he became the first person to make a public wireless broadcast.

By 1910, these various wireless systems had come to be called "radio".

== Wireless communication theories and methods previous to radio ==
Before the discovery of electromagnetic waves and the development of radio communication, there were many wireless telegraph systems proposed and tested. In April 1872 William Henry Ward received U.S. patent 126,356 for a wireless telegraphy system where he theorized that convection currents in the atmosphere could carry signals like a telegraph wire. A few months after Ward received his patent, Mahlon Loomis of West Virginia received U.S. patent 129,971 for a similar "wireless telegraph" in July 1872. The patented system claimed to utilize atmospheric electricity to eliminate the overhead wire used by the existing telegraph systems. It did not contain diagrams or specific methods and it did not refer to or incorporate any known scientific theory.

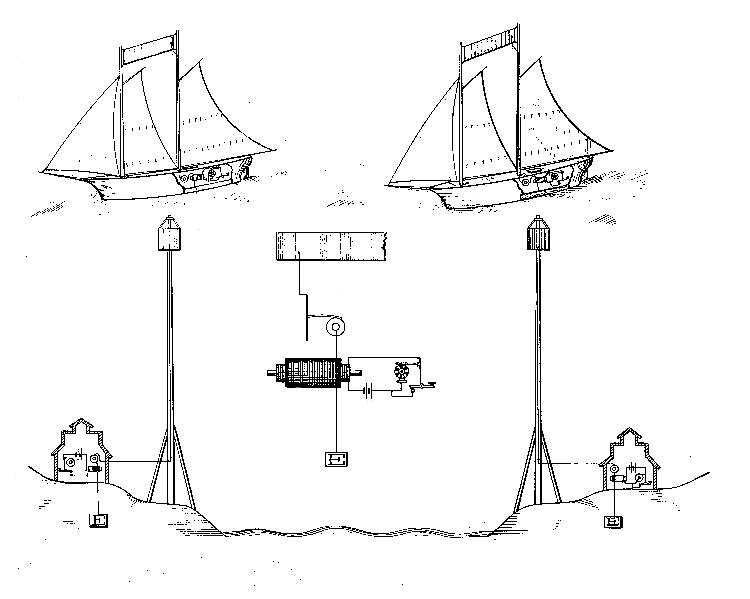
Thomas Edison's 1891 patent for a ship-to-shore wireless telegraph that used electrostatic induction

In the United States, Thomas Edison, in the mid-1880s, patented an electromagnetic induction system he called "grasshopper telegraphy", which allowed telegraphic signals to jump the short distance between a running train and telegraph wires running parallel to the tracks. In the United Kingdom, William Preece was able to develop an electromagnetic induction telegraph system that, with antenna wires many kilometers long, could transmit across gaps of about 5 kilometres (3.1 miles). Inventor Nathan Stubblefield, between 1885 and 1892, also worked on an induction transmission system.

A form of wireless telephony is recorded in four patents for the photophone, invented jointly by Alexander Graham Bell and Charles Sumner Tainter in 1880. The photophone allowed for the transmission of sound on a beam of light, and on 3 June 1880, Bell and Tainter transmitted the world's first wireless telephone message on their newly invented form of light telecommunication.

In the early 1890s Nikola Tesla began his research into high-frequency electricity. Tesla was aware of Hertz's experiments with electromagnetic waves from 1889 on but doubted they existed, and agreed with the prevailing scientific thought at that time that they probably only travel in straight lines, making them useless for long range transmission.

Instead of using radio waves, Tesla's efforts were focused on building a conduction-based power distribution system, although he noted in 1893 that his system could also incorporate communication. His laboratory work and later large-scale experiments at Colorado Springs led him to the conclusion that he could build a conduction-based worldwide wireless system that would use the Earth itself (via injecting very large amounts of an electric current into the ground) as the means to conduct the signal very long distances (across the Earth), overcoming the perceived limitations of other systems. He went on to try to implement his ideas of power transmission and wireless telecommunication in his very large but unsuccessful Wardenclyffe Tower project.

== Development of electromagnetism ==
Experiments and theory

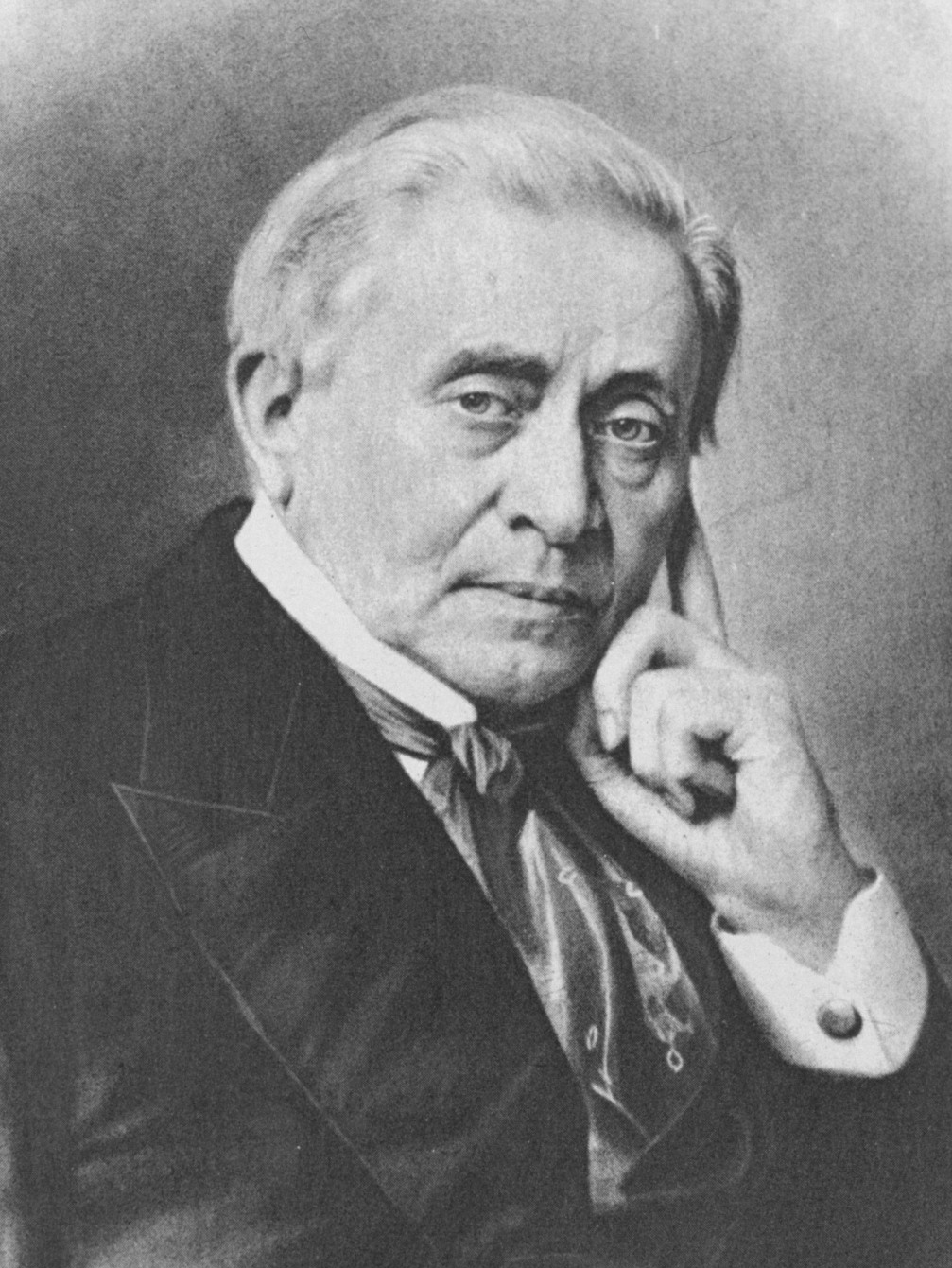
Joseph Henry

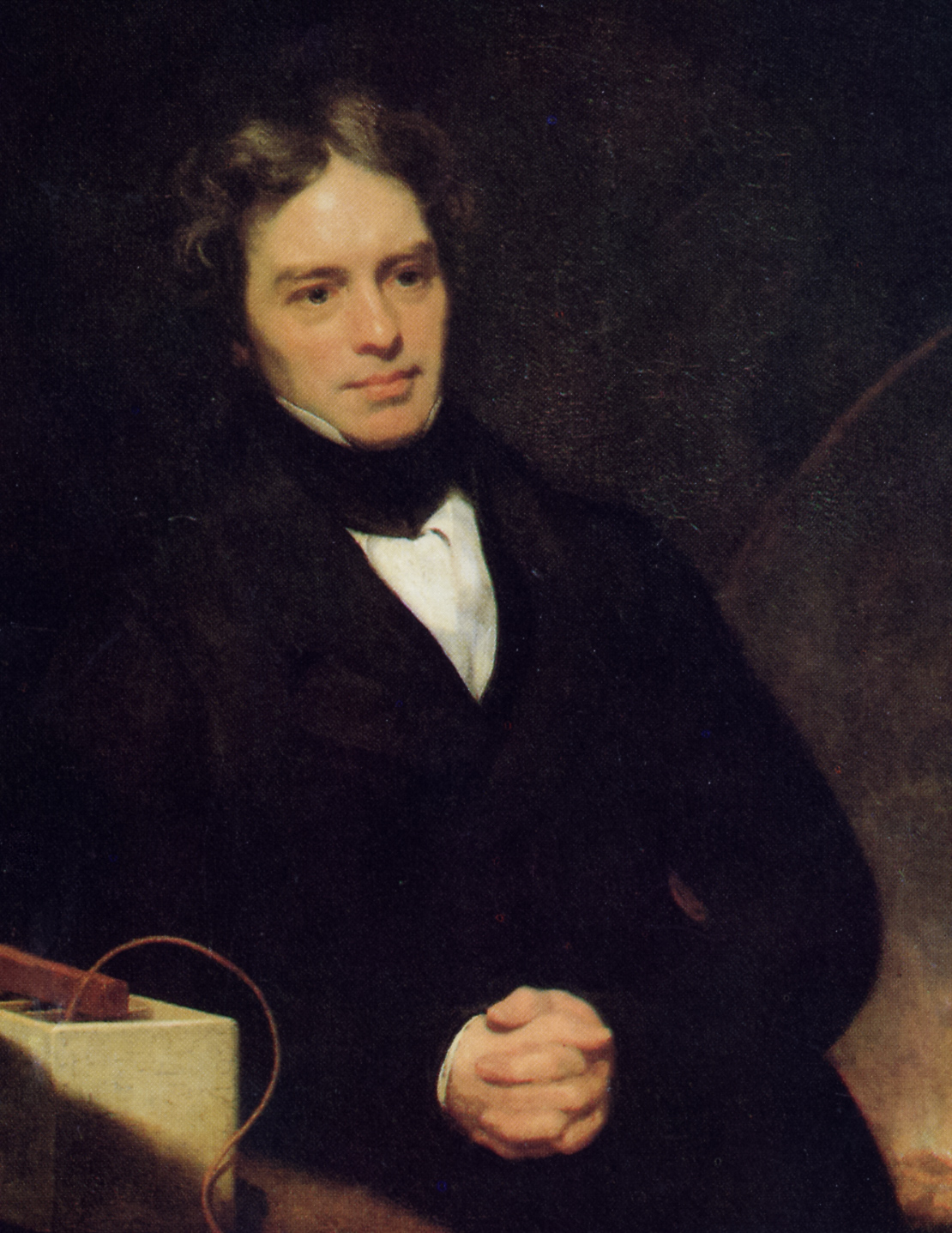
Michael Faraday

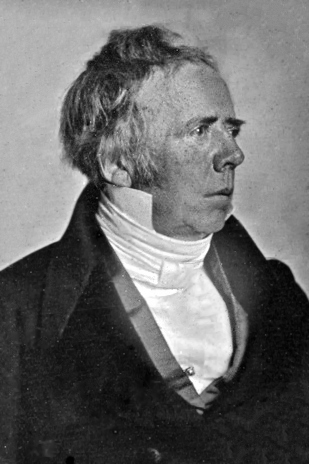
Hans Christian Ørsted

Various scientists proposed that electricity and magnetism were linked. Around 1800 Alessandro Volta developed the first means of producing an electric current. In 1802 Gian Domenico Romagnosi may have suggested a relationship between electricity and magnetism but his reports went unnoticed. In 1820 Hans Christian Ørsted performed a simple and today widely known experiment on electric current and magnetism. He demonstrated that a wire carrying a current could deflect a magnetized compass needle. Ørsted's work influenced André-Marie Ampère to produce a theory of electromagnetism. Several scientists speculated that light might be connected with electricity or magnetism.

In 1831, Michael Faraday began a series of experiments in which he discovered electromagnetic induction. The relation was mathematically modelled by Faraday's law, which subsequently became one of the four Maxwell equations. Faraday proposed that electromagnetic forces extended into the empty space around the conductor, but did not complete his work involving that proposal. In 1846 Michael Faraday speculated that light was a wave disturbance in a "force field".

Expanding upon a series of experiments by Felix Savary, between 1842 and 1850 Joseph Henry performed experiments detecting inductive magnetic effects over a distance of 200 feet (61 m). He was the first (1838–42) to produce high frequency AC electrical oscillations, and to point out and experimentally demonstrate that the discharge of a capacitor under certain conditions is oscillatory, or, as he puts it, consists "of a principal discharge in one direction and then several reflex actions backward and forward, each more feeble than the preceding until equilibrium is attained". This view was also later adopted by Helmholtz, the mathematical demonstration of this fact was first given by Lord Kelvin in his paper on "Transient Electric Currents".

=== Maxwell and the theoretical prediction of electromagnetic waves ===
Maxwell and electromagnetic waves

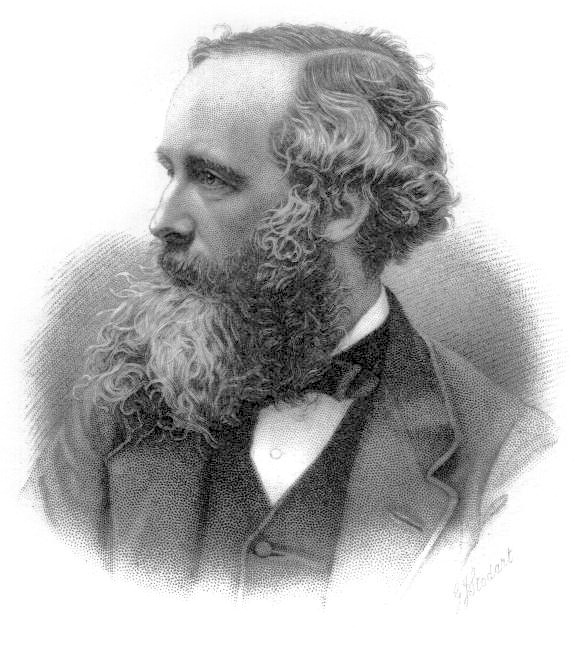
James Clerk Maxwell

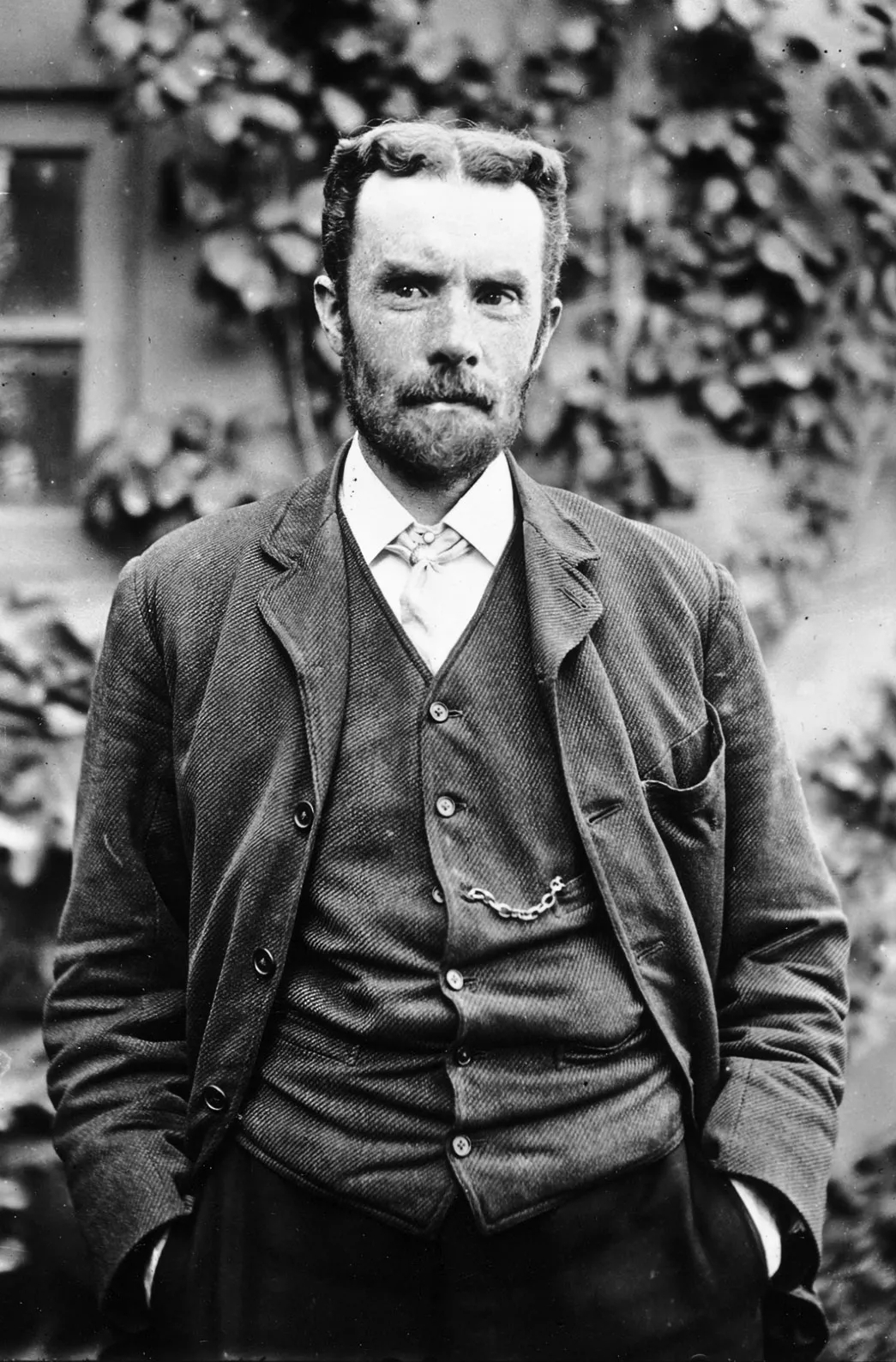
Oliver Heaviside

Between 1861 and 1865, based on the earlier experimental work of Faraday and other scientists and on his own modification to Ampere's law, James Clerk Maxwell developed his theory of electromagnetism, which predicted the existence of electromagnetic waves. In 1864 Maxwell described the theoretical basis of the propagation of electromagnetic waves in his paper to the Royal Society, "A Dynamical Theory of the Electromagnetic Field." This theory united all previously unrelated observations, experiments and equations of electricity, magnetism, and optics into a consistent theory. His set of equations—Maxwell's equations—demonstrated that electricity, magnetism, and light are all manifestations of the same phenomenon, the electromagnetic field. Subsequently, all other classic laws or equations of these disciplines were special cases of Maxwell's equations. Maxwell's work in electromagnetism has been called the "second great unification in physics", after Newton's unification of gravity in the 17th century.

Oliver Heaviside later reformulated Maxwell's original equations into the set of four vector equations that are generally known today as Maxwell's equations. Neither Maxwell nor Heaviside transmitted or received radio waves; however, their equations for electromagnetic fields established principles for radio design, and remain the standard expression of classical electromagnetism.

Of Maxwell's work, Albert Einstein wrote:

"Imagine [Maxwell's] feelings when the differential equations he had formulated proved to him that electromagnetic fields spread in the form of polarised waves, and at the speed of light! To few men in the world has such an experience been vouchsafed... it took physicists some decades to grasp the full significance of Maxwell's discovery, so bold was the leap that his genius forced upon the conceptions of his fellow-workers."

Other physicists were equally impressed with Maxwell's work, such as Richard Feynman who commented:

"From a long view of the history of the world—seen from, say, ten thousand years from now—there can be little doubt that the most significant event of the 19th century will be judged as Maxwell's discovery of the laws of electromagnetism. The American Civil War will pale into provincial insignificance in comparison with this important scientific event of the same decade."

=== Experiments and proposals ===
Berend Wilhelm Feddersen, a German physicist, in 1859, as a private scholar in Leipzig, succeeded in experiments with the Leyden jar to prove that electric sparks were composed of damped oscillations.

In 1870 the German physicist Wilhelm von Bezold discovered and demonstrated the fact that the advancing and reflected oscillations produced in conductors by a capacitor discharge gave rise to interference phenomena. Professors Elihu Thomson and E. J. Houston in 1876 made a number of experiments and observations on high frequency oscillatory discharges. In 1883 George FitzGerald suggested at a British Association meeting that electromagnetic waves could be generated by the discharge of a capacitor, but the suggestion was not followed up, possibly because no means was known for detecting the waves.

=== Hertz experimentally verifies Maxwell's theory ===
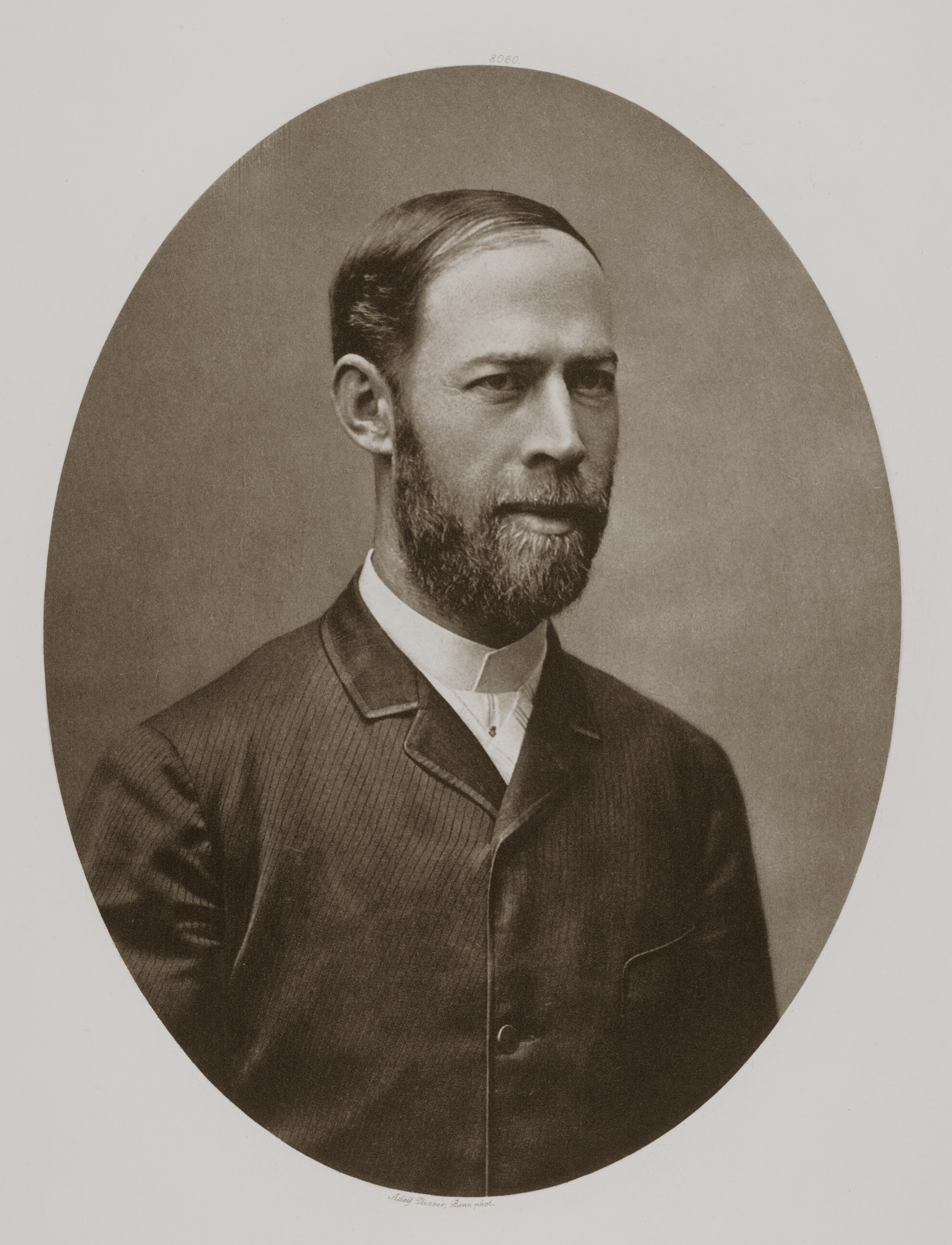
Heinrich Hertz

When German physicist Heinrich Rudolf Hertz was looking for a subject for his doctoral dissertation in 1879, instructor Hermann von Helmholtz suggested he try to prove Maxwell's theory of electromagnetism. Hertz initially couldn't see any way to test the theory but his observation, in the autumn of 1886, of discharging a Leyden jar into a large coil and producing a spark in an adjacent coil gave him the idea of how to build a test apparatus. Using a Ruhmkorff coil to create sparks across a gap (a spark gap transmitter) and observing the sparks created between the gap in a nearby metal loop antenna, between 1886 and 1888 Hertz would conduct a series of scientific experiments that would validate Maxwell's theory. Hertz published his results in a series of papers between 1887 and 1890, and again in complete book form in 1893.

The first of the papers published, "On Very Rapid Electric Oscillations", gives an account of the chronological course of his investigation, as far as it was carried out up to the end of the year 1886 and the beginning of 1887.

For the first time, electromagnetic radio waves ("Hertzian waves") were intentionally and unequivocally proven to have been transmitted through free space by a spark-gap device, and detected over a short distance.

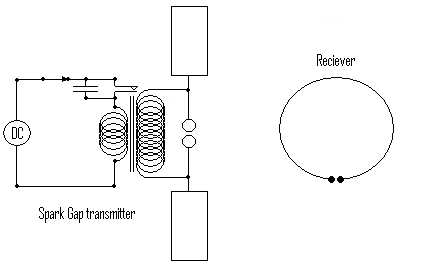
1887 experimental setup of Hertz's apparatus

Hertz was able to have some control over the frequencies of his radiated waves by altering the inductance and capacitance of his transmitting and receiving antennas. He focused the electromagnetic waves using a corner reflector and a parabolic reflector, to demonstrate that radio behaved the same as light, as Maxwell's electromagnetic theory had predicted more than 20 years earlier.

Hertz did not devise a system for practical utilization of electromagnetic waves, nor did he describe any potential applications of the technology. Hertz was asked by his students at the University of Bonn what use there might be for these waves. He replied, "It's of no use whatsoever. This is just an experiment that proves Maestro Maxwell was right, we just have these mysterious electromagnetic waves that we cannot see with the naked eye. But they are there."

Many physicists quickly realized that Hertzian waves could be used (instead of light) in systems akin to optical telegraph: for example, Richard Threlfall and John Perry suggested that in 1890, Alexander Pelham Trotter in 1891 and Frederick Thomas Trouton in 1892, however they all thought about it in terms of short flashes as opposed to telegraphic dots and dashes. In what may have been a little noticed article titled 'Some possibilities of electricity' in the February 1892 in The Fortnightly Review, Sir William Crookes described wireless telegraphy as having been accomplished a year earlier, although the method and type is not described. The American physicist Amos Emerson Dolbear brought similar attention to the idea a year later. Hertz's health deteriorated after a severe infection in 1892 and he died in 1894, so the art of radio wave communication was left to others to implement into a practical form.

== Pre-Hertz radio wave detection ==
During 1789–91, Luigi Galvani noticed that a spark generated nearby caused a convulsion in a frog's leg being touched by a scalpel. In different experiments, he noticed contractions in frogs' legs caused by lightning and a luminous discharge from a charged Leyden jar that disappeared over time and was renewed whenever a spark occurred nearby.

Joseph Henry observed magnetised needles from lightning in the early 1840s.

In 1852 Samuel Alfred Varley noticed a remarkable fall in the resistance of masses of metallic filings under the action of atmospheric electrical discharges.

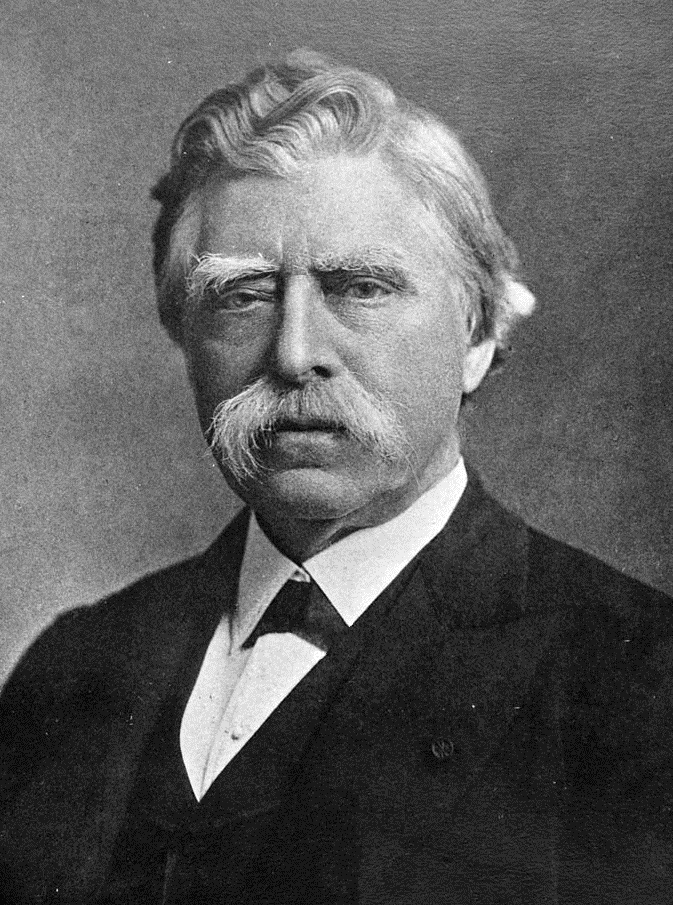
David Edward Hughes

Towards the end of 1875, while experimenting with the telegraph, Thomas Edison noted a phenomenon that he termed "etheric force", announcing it to the press on 28 November. He abandoned this research when Elihu Thomson, among others, ridiculed the idea, claiming it was electromagnetic induction.

In 1879 the experimenter and inventor David Edward Hughes, working in London, discovered that a bad contact in a Bell telephone he was using in his experiments seemed to be sparking when he worked on a nearby induction balance (an early form of metal detector). He developed an improved detector to pick up this unknown "extra current" based on his new microphone design (similar to later detectors known as coherers or crystal detectors) and developed a way to interrupt his induction balance to produce a series of sparks. By trial and error experiments he eventually found he could pick up these "aerial waves" as he carried his telephone device down the street out to a range of 500 yards (460 m).

On 20 February 1880, he demonstrated his experiment to representatives of the Royal Society including Thomas Henry Huxley, Sir George Gabriel Stokes, and William Spottiswoode, then president of the Society. Stokes was convinced the phenomenon Hughes was demonstrating was merely electromagnetic induction, not a type of conduction through the air. Hughes was not a physicist and seems to have accepted Stokes observations and did not pursue the experiments any further. His work may have been the wireless experiment William Crookes recalled in his 1892 Fortnightly Review review of 'Some possibilities of electricity'.

== Development of radio waves ==
Early experimenters

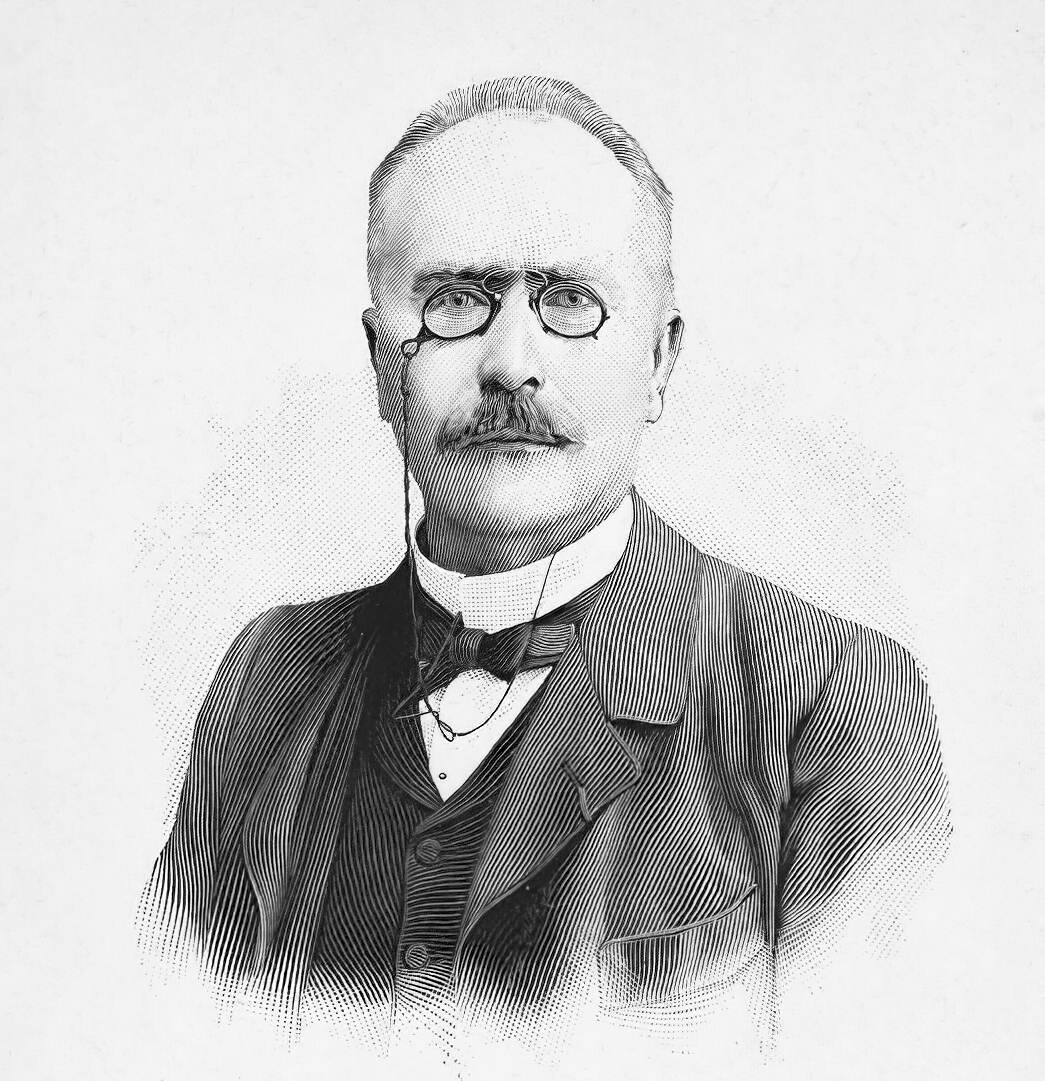
Édouard Branly

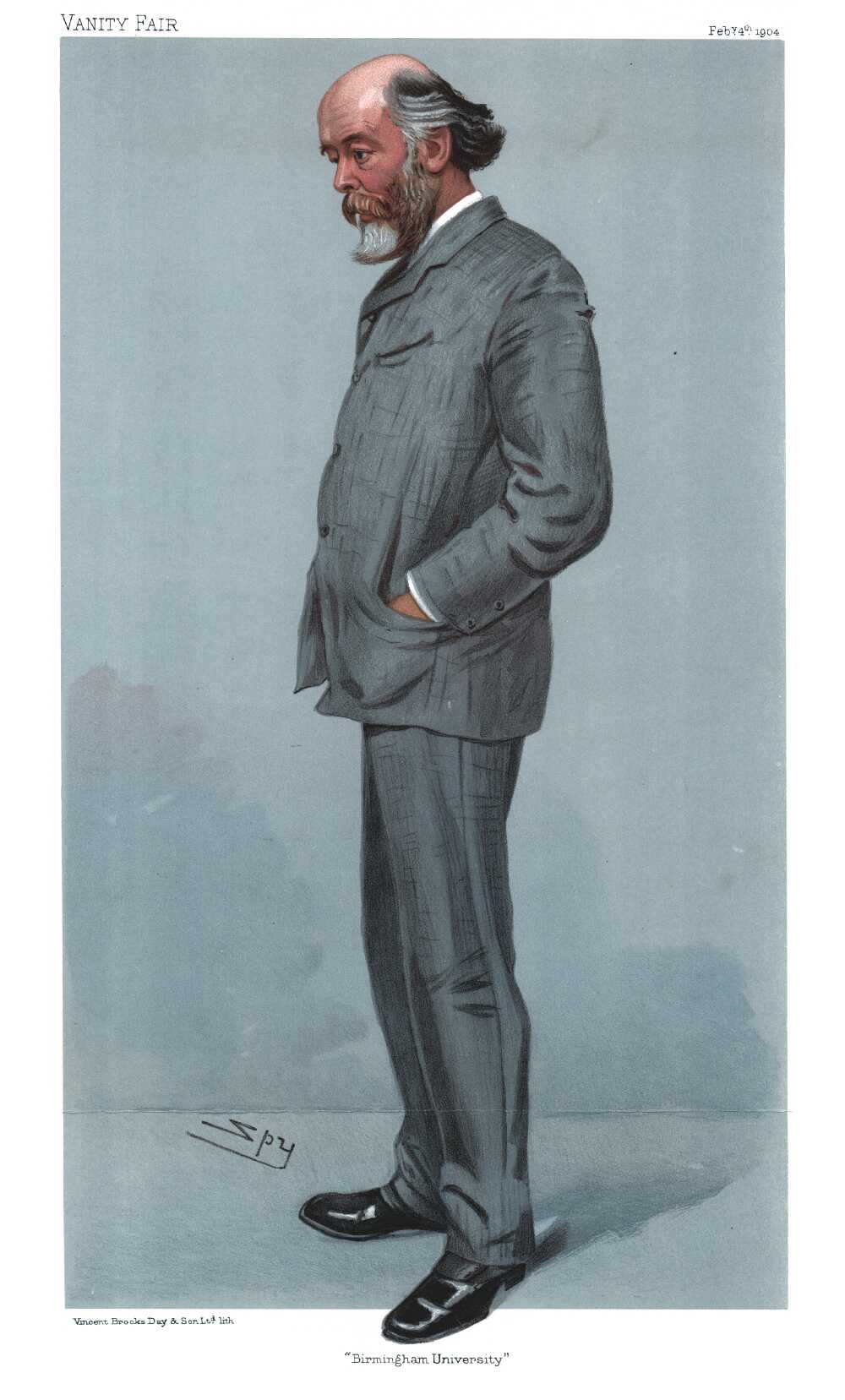
Oliver Joseph Lodge

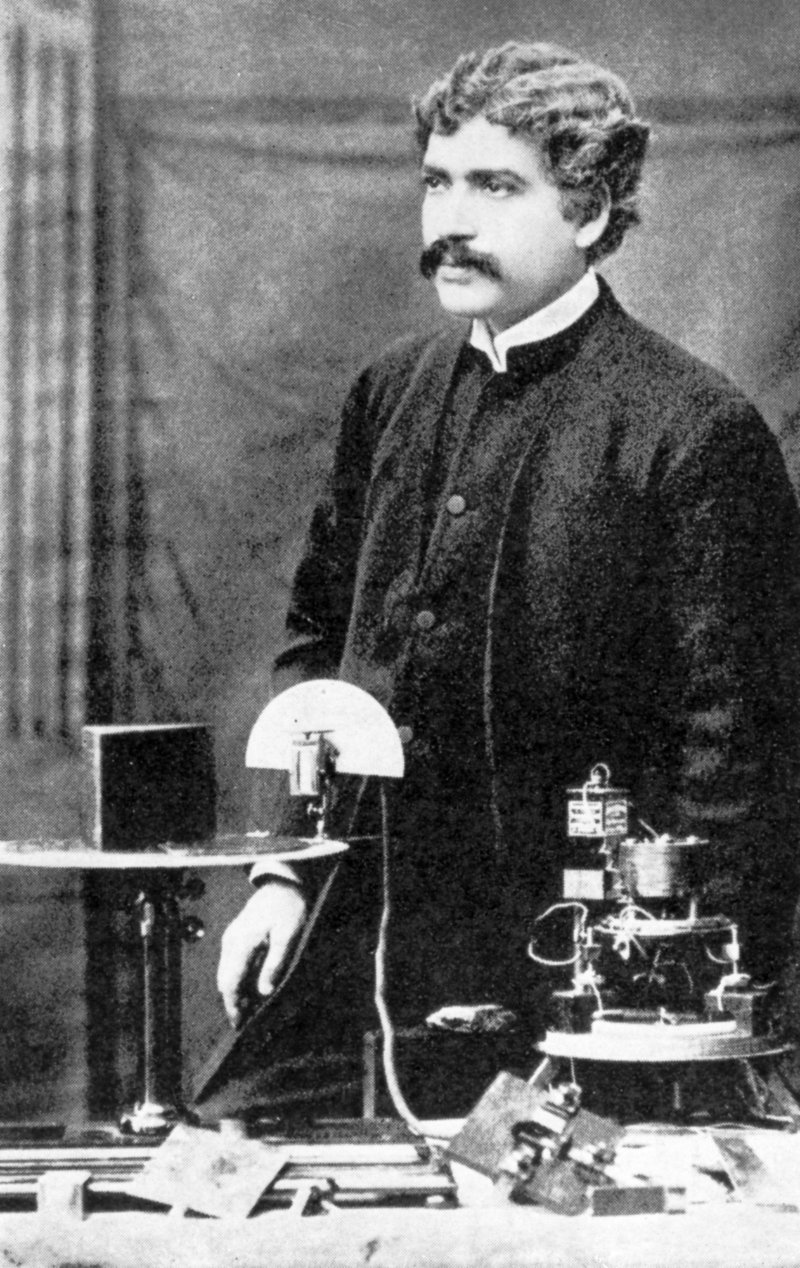
Jagadish Chandra Bose

=== The Branly detector ===
In 1890, Édouard Branly demonstrated a new type of detector. Branly discovered that loose metal filings, which in a normal state have a high electrical resistance, lost their resistance in the presence of electric oscillations generated by a spark, and became practically conductors of electricity. This Branly showed by placing metal filings in a glass box or tube, and making them part of an ordinary electric circuit. Branly further found that when the filings had once adhered together they retained their low resistance until shaken apart, for instance, by tapping on the tube. Branly's filing tube came to light when it was described by Dr. Dawson Turner at a meeting of the British Association in Edinburgh and Scottish electrical engineer and astronomer George Forbes suggests the filings tube may be reacting in the presence of Hertzian waves. This device would be picked up by Oliver Lodge in his experiments.

=== Lodge's demonstrations ===
British physicist and writer Sir Oliver Lodge came close to being the first to prove the existence of Maxwell's electromagnetic waves. In a series of spring 1888 experiments conducted with a Leyden jar connected to a length of wire with spaced spark gaps he noticed he was getting different size sparks and a glow pattern along the wire that seemed to be a function of wavelength. Before he could present his own findings he learned of Hertz' series of proofs on the same subject.

On 1 June 1894, at a meeting of the British Association for the Advancement of Science at Oxford University, Lodge gave a memorial lecture on the work of Hertz (recently deceased) and the German physicist's proof of the existence of electromagnetic waves 6 years earlier. Lodge set up a demonstration on the quasi-optical nature of "Hertzian waves" (radio waves) and demonstrated their similarity to light and vision including reflection and transmission. Later in June and on 14 August 1894 he did similar experiments, increasing the distance of transmission up to 55 meters. In these lectures Lodge demonstrated a detector that would become standard in radio work, an improved version of Branly's detector which Lodge dubbed the coherer. It consisted of a glass tube containing metal filings between two electrodes. When the small electrical charge from waves from an antenna were applied to the electrodes, the metal particles would cling together or "cohere" causing the device to become conductive allowing the current from a battery to pass through it. In Lodge's setup the slight impulses from the coherer were picked up by a mirror galvanometer which would deflect a beam of light being projected on it, giving a visual signal that the impulse was received. After receiving a signal the metal filings in the coherer were broken apart or "decohered" by a manually operated vibrator or by the vibrations of a bell placed on the table near by that rang every time a transmission was received. Lodge also demonstrated tuning using a pair of Leyden jars that could be brought into resonance. Lodge's lectures were widely publicized and his techniques influenced and were expanded on by other radio pioneers including Augusto Righi and his student Guglielmo Marconi, Alexander Popov, Lee de Forest, and Jagadish Chandra Bose.

Lodge at the time seemed to see no value in using radio waves for signalling or wireless telegraphy and there is debate as to whether he even bothered to demonstrate communication during his lectures. Physicist John Ambrose Fleming pointed out that Lodge's lecture was a physics experiment, not a demonstration of telegraphic signaling. After radio communication was developed Lodge's lecture would become the focus of priority disputes over who invented wireless telegraphy (radio). His early demonstration and later development of radio tuning (his 1898 Syntonic tuning patent) would lead to patent disputes with the Marconi Company. When Lodge's syntonic patent was extended in 1911 for another seven years Marconi agreed to settle the patent dispute and purchase the patent.

=== Bose's microwave research ===
Inspired by Lodge's demonstrations the Indian physicist, Jagadish Chandra Bose, in 1894 - 1900 conducted the first research into the properties of millimetre length radio waves, in the microwave range of about 5 mm wavelength. Working from a small laboratory he set up in November 1894 at the Presidency College of the University of Calcutta, he researched the properties of materials at microwave frequencies, inventing a microwave spectrometer consisting of a spark transmitter, coherer receiver, as well as the first waveguide, horn antenna and semiconductor crystal detector

In November 1895 at a public demonstration at the Town Hall of Kolkata, Bose showed how these new waves could travel through the human body (of Lieutenant Governor Sir William Mackenzie), and over a distance of 23 metres (75') through two intervening walls to a trigger apparatus he had set up to ring a bell and ignite gunpowder in a closed room. However he was not interested in researching the use of radio waves for communication.

== Adaptations of radio waves ==
=== Popov's lightning detector ===
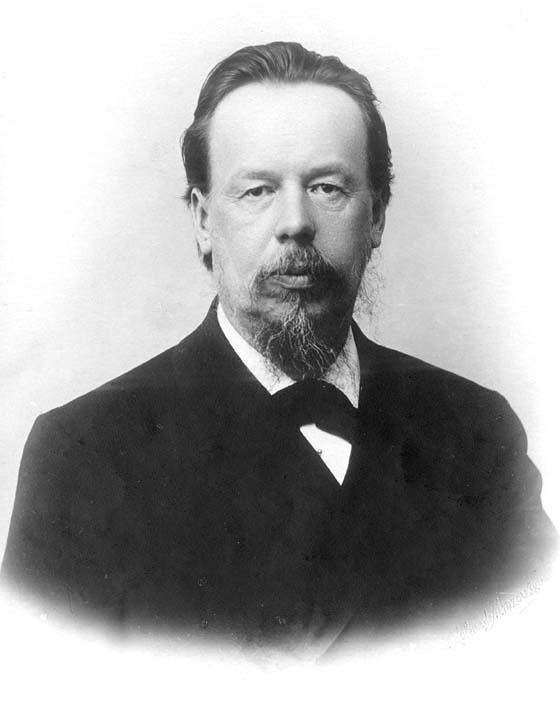
Alexander Stepanovich Popov

In 1894–95 the Russian physicist Alexander Stepanovich Popov conducted experiments developing a radio receiver, an improved version of coherer-based design by Oliver Lodge. His design with coherer auto-tapping mechanism was designed as a lightning detector to help the forest service track lightning strikes that could start fires. His receiver proved to be able to sense lightning strikes at distances of up to 30 km. Popov built a version of the receiver that was capable of automatically recording lightning strikes on paper rolls. Popov presented his radio receiver to the Russian Physical and Chemical Society on 7 May 1895 — the day has been celebrated in the Russian Federation as "Radio Day" promoted in eastern European countries as the inventor of radio. The paper on his findings was published the same year (15 December 1895). Popov had recorded, at the end of 1895, that he was hoping for distant signaling with radio waves. He did not apply for a patent for this invention.

=== Tesla's boat ===
In 1898 Nikola Tesla developed a radio/coherer based remote-controlled boat, with a form of secure communication between transmitter and receiver, which he demonstrated in 1898. Tesla called his invention a "teleautomaton" and he hoped to sell it as a guided naval torpedo.

== Radio based wireless telegraphy ==
=== Marconi ===
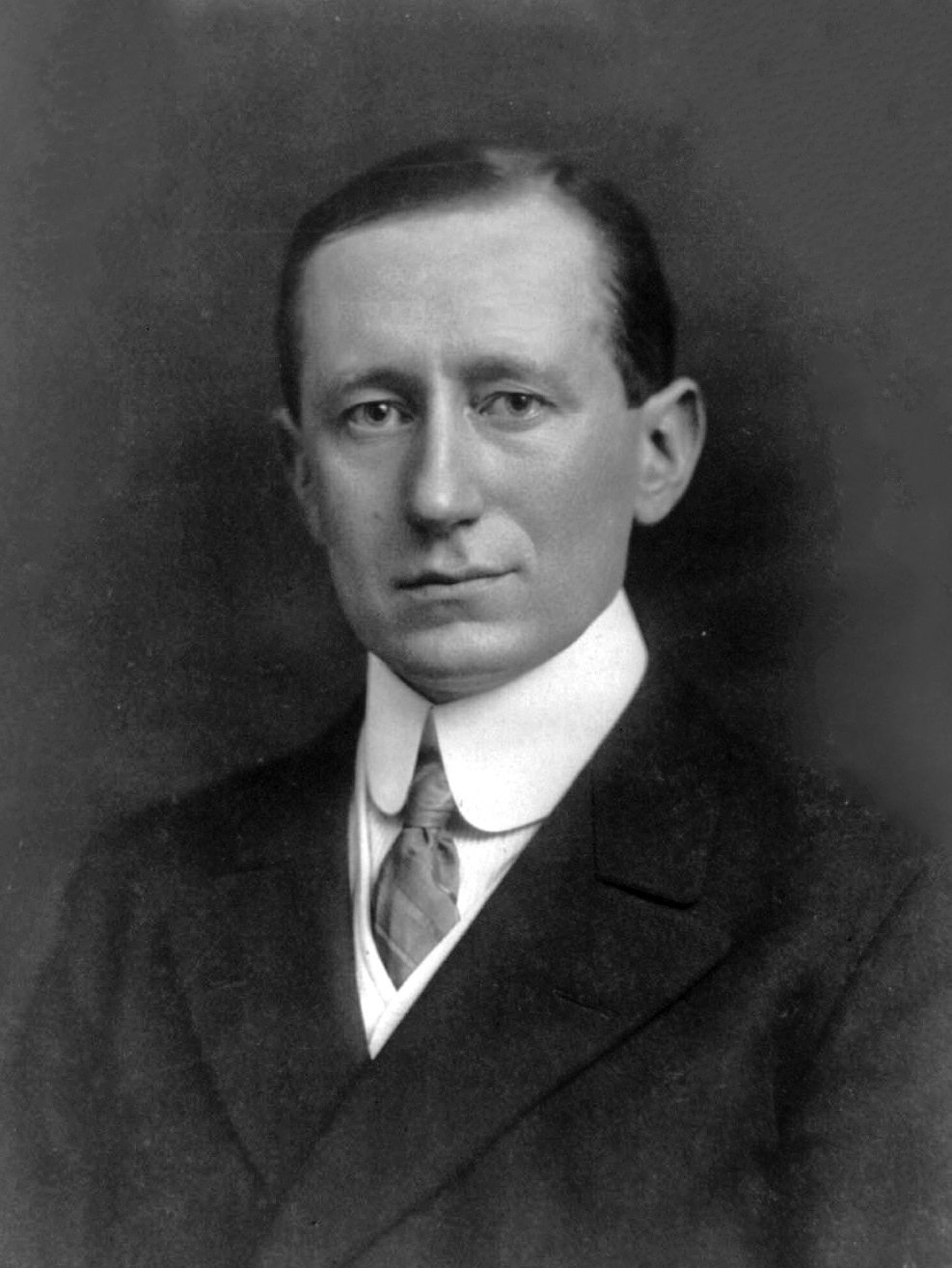
Guglielmo Marconi

Guglielmo Marconi studied at the Leghorn Technical School, and acquainted himself with the published writings of Professor Augusto Righi of the University of Bologna. In 1894, Sir William Preece delivered a paper to the Royal Institution in London on electric signalling without wires. In 1894 at the Royal Institution lectures, Lodge delivered "The Work of Hertz and Some of His Successors". Marconi is said to have read, while on vacation in 1894, about the experiments that Hertz did in the 1880s. Marconi also read about Tesla's work. It was at this time that Marconi began to understand that radio waves could be used for wireless communications. Marconi's early apparatus was a development of Hertz's laboratory apparatus into a system designed for communications purposes. At first Marconi used a transmitter to ring a bell in a receiver in his attic laboratory. He then moved his experiments out-of-doors on the family estate near Bologna, Italy, to communicate further. He replaced Hertz's vertical dipole with a vertical wire topped by a metal sheet, with an opposing terminal connected to the ground. On the receiver side, Marconi replaced the spark gap with a metal powder coherer, a detector developed by Edouard Branly and other experimenters. Marconi transmitted radio signals for about 1.5 miles (2.4 km) at the end of 1895.

Marconi was awarded a patent for radio with British patent No. 12,039, Improvements in Transmitting Electrical Impulses and Signals and in Apparatus There-for. The complete specification was filed 2 March 1897. This was Marconi's initial patent for the radio, though it used various earlier techniques of various other experimenters and resembled the instrument demonstrated by others (including Popov). During this time spark-gap wireless telegraphy was widely researched. In July, 1896, Marconi got his invention and new method of telegraphy to the attention of Preece, then engineer-in-chief to the British Government Telegraph Service, who had for the previous twelve years interested himself in the development of wireless telegraphy by the inductive-conductive method. On 4 June 1897, he delivered "Signalling through Space without Wires". Preece devoted considerable time to exhibiting and explaining the Marconi apparatus at the Royal Institution in London, stating that Marconi invented a new relay which had high sensitiveness and delicacy.

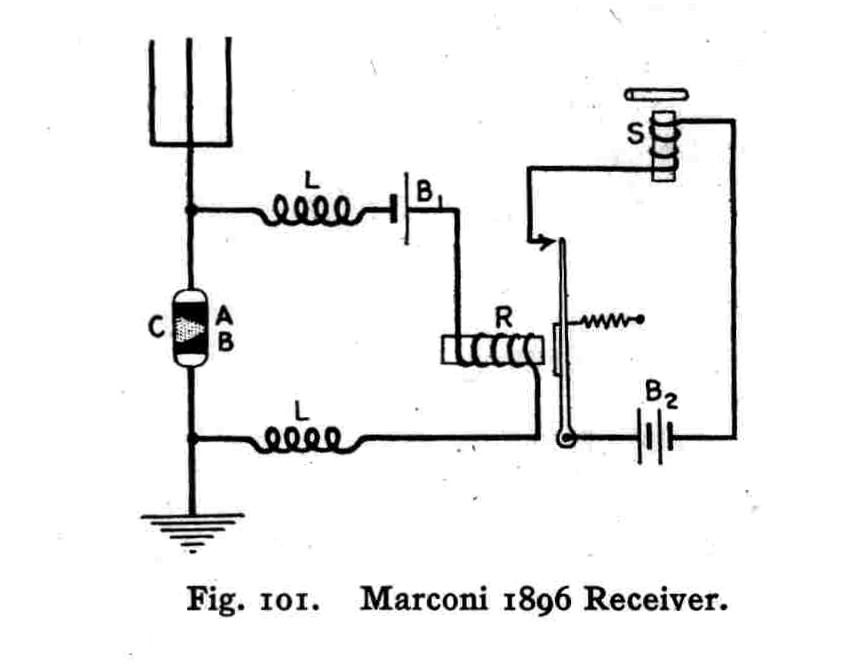
Marconi plain aerial, 1896 receiver

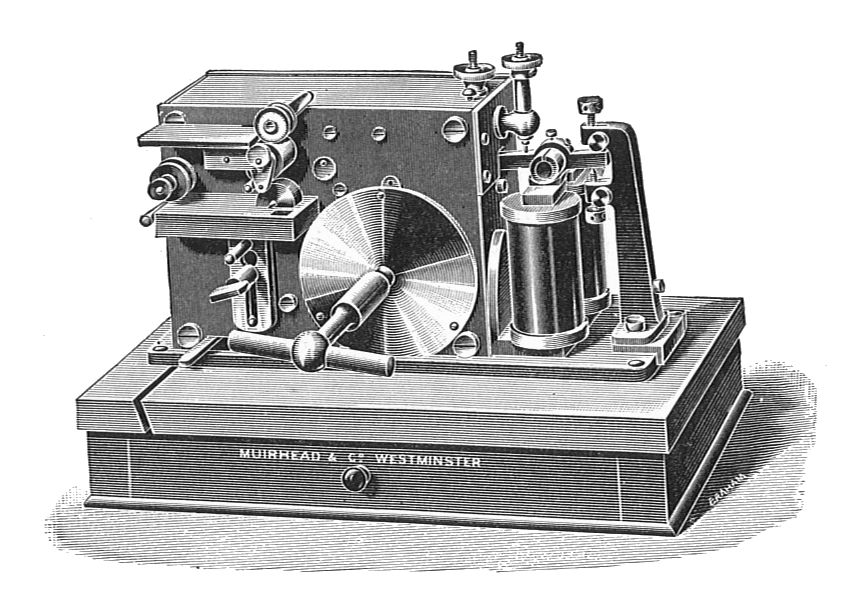
Muirhead Morse inker

The Marconi Company Ltd. was founded by Marconi in 1897, known as the Wireless Telegraph Trading Signal Company. Also in 1897, Marconi established the radio station at Niton, Isle of Wight, England. Marconi's wireless telegraphy was inspected by the Post Office Telegraph authorities; they made a series of experiments with Marconi's system of telegraphy without connecting wires, in the Bristol Channel. The October wireless signals of 1897 were sent from Salisbury Plain to Bath, a distance of 34 miles (55 km). Around 1900 Marconi developed an empirical law that, for simple vertical sending and receiving antennas of equal height, the maximum working telegraphic distance varied as the square of the height of the antenna. This became known as Marconi's law.

Other experimental stations were established at Lavernock Point, near Penarth; on the Flat Holmes, an island in mid-channel, and at Brean Down, a promontory on the Somerset side. Signals were obtained between the first and last-named points, a distance of approximately 8 miles (13 km). The receiving instrument used was a Morse inkwriter of the Post Office pattern. In 1898, Marconi opened a radio factory in Hall Street, Chelmsford, England, employing around 50 people. In 1899, Marconi announced his invention of the "iron-mercury-iron coherer with telephone detector" in a paper presented at Royal Society, London.

In May 1898, communication was established for the Corporation of Lloyds between Ballycastle and the Lighthouse on Rathlin Island in the north of Ireland. In July 1898, the Marconi telegraphy was employed to report the results of yacht races at the Kingstown Regatta for the Dublin Express newspaper. A set of instruments were fitted up in a room at Kingstown, and another on board a steamer, the Flying Huntress. The aerial conductor on shore was a strip of wire netting attached to a mast 40 feet (12 m) high, and several hundred messages were sent and correctly received during the progress of the races.

At this time the Prince of Wales, later King Edward VII, had the misfortune to injure his knee, and was confined on board the royal yacht Osborne, based in Cowes Bay. Marconi fitted up his apparatus on board the royal yacht by request, and also at Ladywood Cottage, in the grounds of Osborne House, Isle of Wight, where his Mother Queen Victoria was staying. More than 150 messages were sent during the 16 days of the Prince's convalescence. The distances covered were small; but as the yacht moved about, on some occasions high hills were interposed so that the aerial wires were overtopped by hundreds of feet, yet this was no obstacle to communication. These demonstrations led the Corporation of Trinity House to afford an opportunity for testing the system in practice between the South Foreland Lighthouse, near Dover, and the East Goodwin Lightship, on the Goodwin Sands. This installation was set in operation on 24 December 1898, and proved to be of value. It was shown that when once the apparatus was set up it could be worked by ordinary seamen with very little training.

At the end of 1898 electric wave telegraphy established by Marconi had demonstrated its utility, especially for communication between ship and ship and ship and shore.

The Haven Hotel station and Wireless Telegraph Mast was where much of Marconi's research work on wireless telegraphy was carried out after 1898. In 1899, he transmitted messages across the English Channel. Also in 1899, Marconi delivered "Wireless Telegraphy" to the Institution of Electrical Engineers. In addition, in 1899, W. H. Preece delivered "Aetheric Telegraphy", stating that the experimental stage in wireless telegraphy had been passed in 1894 and inventors were then entering the commercial stage. Preece, continuing in the lecture, details the work of Marconi and other British inventors. In April 1899, Marconi's experiments were repeated for the first time in the United States, by Jerome Green at the University of Notre Dame. In October, 1899, the progress of the yachts in the international race between the Columbia and Shamrock was successfully reported by aerial telegraphy, as many as 4,000 words having been (as is said) despatched from the two ship stations to the shore stations. Immediately afterward the apparatus was placed by request at the service of the United States Navy Board, and some highly interesting experiments followed under Marconi's personal supervision. The Marconi Company was renamed Marconi's Wireless Telegraph Company in 1900.

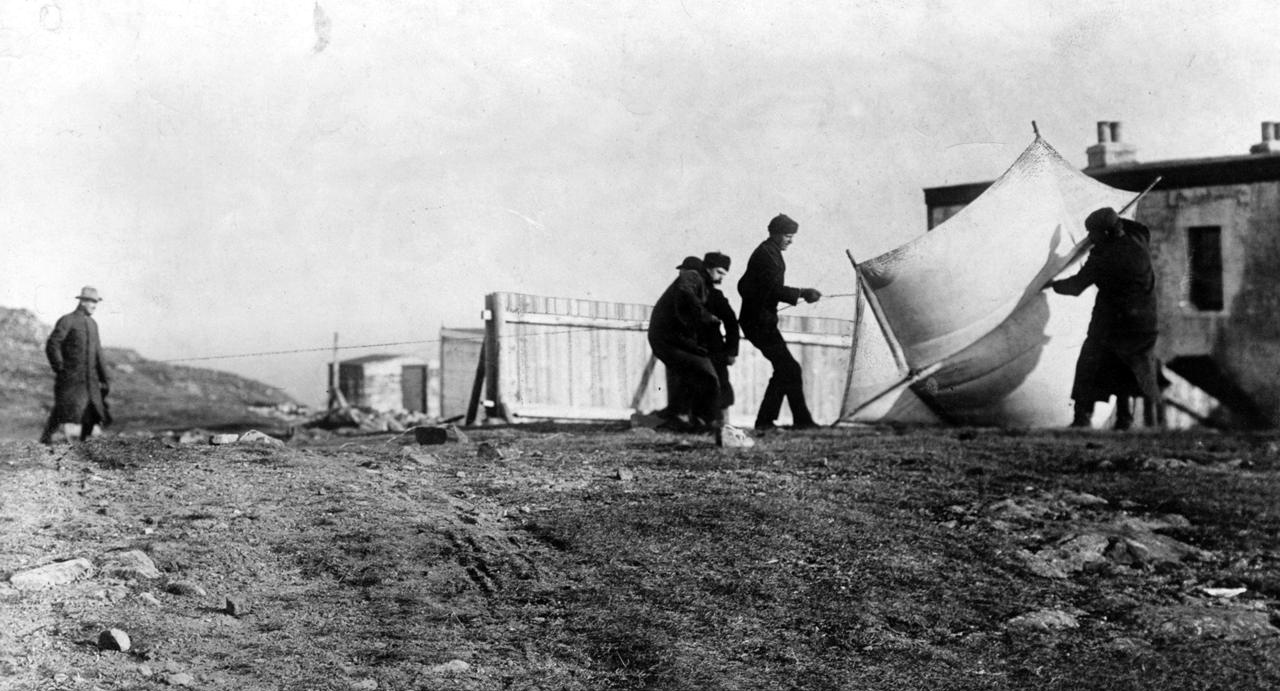
Marconi watching associates raise kite antenna at St. John's, December 1901

In 1901, Marconi claimed to have received daytime transatlantic radio frequency signals at a wavelength of 366 metres (820 kHz). Marconi established a wireless transmitting station at Marconi House, Rosslare Strand, Co. Wexford in 1901 to act as a link between Poldhu in Cornwall and Clifden in Co. Galway. His announcement on 12 December 1901, using a 152.4-metre (500 ft) kite-supported antenna for reception, stated that the message was received at Signal Hill in St John's, Newfoundland (now part of Canada) via signals transmitted by the company's new high-power station at Poldhu, Cornwall. The message received had been prearranged and was known to Marconi, consisting of the Morse letter 'S' – three dots. Bradford has recently contested the reported success, however, based on theoretical work as well as a reenactment of the experiment. It is now well known that long-distance transmission at a wavelength of 366 meters is not possible during the daytime, because the skywave is heavily absorbed by the ionosphere. It is possible that what was heard was only random atmospheric noise, which was mistaken for a signal, or that Marconi may have heard a shortwave harmonic of the signal. The distance between the two points was about 3,500 kilometres (2,200 mi).

The Poldhu to Newfoundland transmission claim has been criticized. There are various science historians, such as Belrose and Bradford, who have cast doubt that the Atlantic was bridged in 1901, but other science historians have taken the position that this was the first transatlantic radio transmission. Critics have claimed that it is more likely that Marconi received stray atmospheric noise from atmospheric electricity in this experiment. The transmitting station in Poldhu, Cornwall used a spark-gap transmitter that could produce a signal in the medium frequency range and with high power levels.

Marconi transmitted from England to Canada and the United States. In this period, a particular electromagnetic receiver, called the Marconi magnetic detector or hysteresis magnetic detector, was developed further by Marconi and was successfully used in his early transatlantic work (1902) and in many of the smaller stations for a number of years. In 1902, a Marconi station was established in the village of Crookhaven, County Cork, Ireland to provide marine radio communications to ships arriving from the Americas. A ship's master could contact shipping line agents ashore to enquire which port was to receive their cargo without the need to come ashore at what was the first port of landfall. Ireland was also, due to its western location, to play a key role in early efforts to send trans-Atlantic messages. Marconi transmitted from his station in Glace Bay, Nova Scotia, Canada across the Atlantic, and on 18 January 1903 a Marconi station sent a message of greetings from Theodore Roosevelt, the President of the United States, to the King of the United Kingdom, marking the first transatlantic radio transmission originating in the United States.

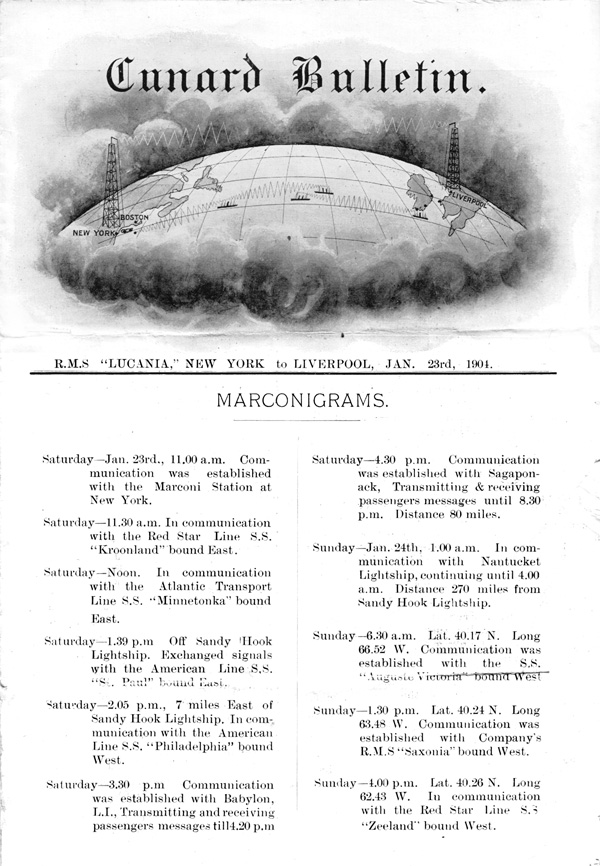
Cunard Daily Bulletin

In 1904, Marconi inaugurated an ocean daily newspaper, the Cunard Daily Bulletin, on the RMS Campania. At the start, passing events were printed in a little pamphlet of four pages called the Cunard Bulletin. The title would read Cunard Daily Bulletin, with subheads for "Marconigrams Direct to the Ship." All the passenger ships of the Cunard Company were fitted with Marconi's system of wireless telegraphy, by means of which constant communication was kept up, either with other ships or with land stations on the eastern or western hemisphere. The RMS Lucania, in October 1903, with Marconi on board, was the first vessel to hold communications with both sides of the Atlantic. The Cunard Daily Bulletin, a 32-page illustrated paper published on board these ships, recorded news received by wireless telegraphy, and was the first ocean newspaper. In August 1903, an agreement was made with the British Government by which Cunard were to build two steamers, to be, with all other Cunard ships, at the disposal of the British Admiralty for hire or purchase whenever they might be required, the Government lending the company £2,600,000 to build the ships and granting them a subsidy of £150,000 a year. One was the RMS Lusitania and another was the RMS Mauretania.

Marconi was awarded the 1909 Nobel Prize in Physics with Karl Ferdinand Braun for their contributions to the development of wireless telegraphy. Marconi's demonstrations of the use of radio for wireless communications, equipping ships with life saving wireless communications, establishing the first transatlantic radio service, and building the first stations for the British shortwave service, have marked his place in history.

In June and July 1923, Marconi's shortwave transmissions took place at night on 97 meters from Poldhu Wireless Station, Cornwall, to his yacht Elettra in the Cape Verde Islands. In September 1924, Marconi transmitted during daytime and nighttime on 32 meters from Poldhu to his yacht in Beirut. In July 1924, Marconi entered into contracts with the British General Post Office (GPO) to install telegraphy circuits from London to Australia, India, South Africa and Canada as the main element of the Imperial Wireless Chain. The UK-to-Canada shortwave "Beam Wireless Service" went into commercial operation on 25 October 1926. Beam Wireless Services from the UK to Australia, South Africa and India went into service in 1927. Electronic components for the system were built at Marconi's New Street wireless factory in Chelmsford.

=== Braun ===
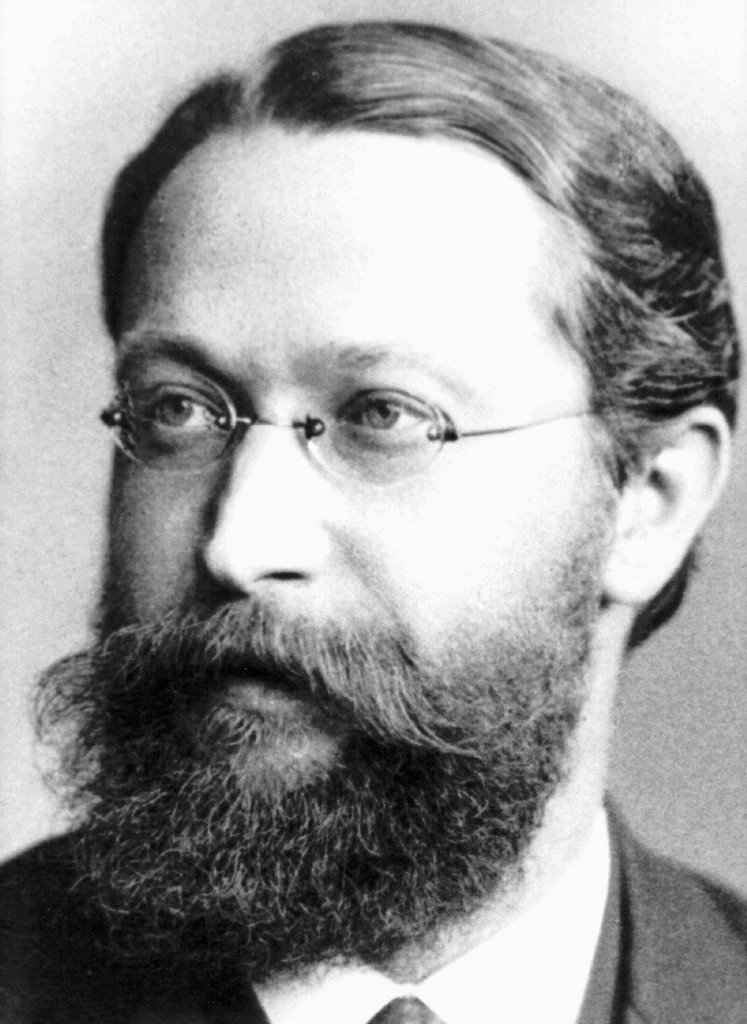
Ferdinand Braun

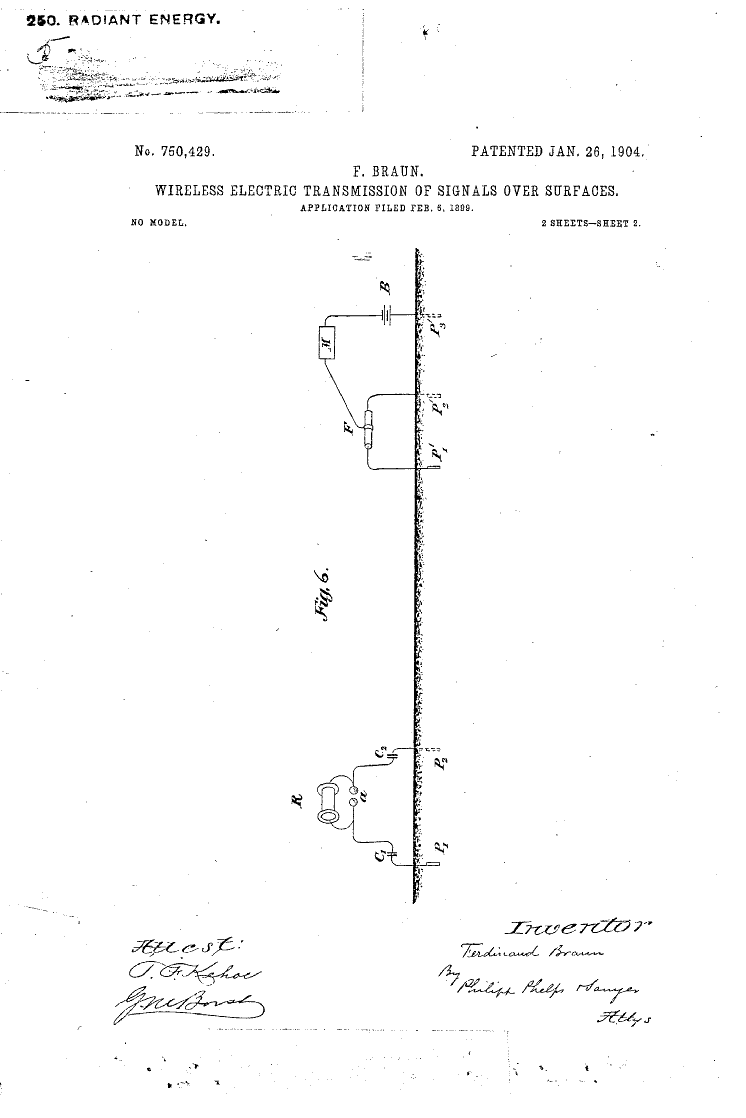
Braun's radiant energy U.S. patent 750,429

Ferdinand Braun's major contributions were the introduction of a closed tuned circuit in the generating part of the transmitter, and its separation from the radiating part (the antenna) by means of inductive coupling, and later on the usage of crystals for receiving purposes. Braun experimented at first at the University of Strasbourg. Braun had written extensively on wireless subjects and was well known through his many contributions to the Electrician and other scientific journals. In 1899, he would apply for the patents, Electro telegraphy by means of condensers and induction coils and Wireless electro transmission of signals over surfaces.

Pioneers working on wireless devices eventually came to a limit of distance they could cover. Connecting the antenna directly to the spark gap produced only a heavily damped pulse train. There were only a few cycles before oscillations ceased. Braun's circuit afforded a much longer sustained oscillation because the energy encountered less loss swinging between coil and Leyden Jars. Also, by means of inductive antenna coupling the radiator was matched to the generator.

In spring 1899 Braun, accompanied by his colleagues Cantor and Zenneck, went to Cuxhaven to continue their experiments at the North Sea. On 6 February 1899, he would apply for the United States Patent, Wireless Electric Transmission of Signals Over Surfaces. Not before long he bridged a distance of 42 km to the city of Mutzing. On 24 September 1900 radio telegraphy signals were exchanged regularly with the island of Heligoland over a distance of 62 km. Lightvessels in the river Elbe and a coast station at Cuxhaven commenced a regular radio telegraph service.

By 1904, the closed circuit system of wireless telegraphy, connected with the name of Braun, was well known and generally adopted in principle. The results of Braun's experiments, published in the Electrician, possess interest, apart from the method employed. Braun showed how the problem could be satisfactorily and economically solved. The closed circuit oscillator has the advantage, as was known, of being able to draw upon the kinetic energy in the oscillator circuit, and thus, because such a circuit can be given a much greater capacity than can be obtained with a radiating aerial alone, much more energy can be stored up and radiated by its employment. The emission is also prolonged, both results tending towards the attainment of the much desired train of undamped waves. The energy available, though greater than with the open system, was still inconsiderable unless very high potentials, with the attendant drawbacks, were used. Braun avoided the use of extremely high potentials for charging the gap and also makes use of a less wasteful gap by sub-dividing it. The chief point in his new arrangement, however, is not the sub-division of the gap merely but their arrangement, by which they are charged in parallel, at low voltages, and discharge in series. The Nobel Prize awarded to Braun in 1909 depicts this design. Braun also discovered the principle behind the phased array antenna, which led to the development of smart antennas and MIMO, in 1905.

=== Stone Stone ===
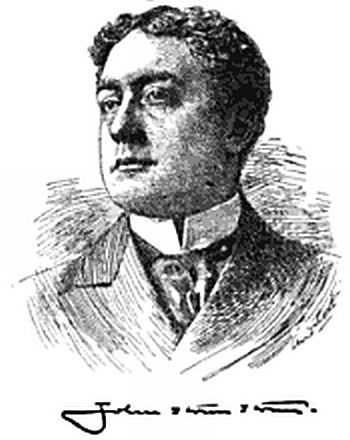
John Stone Stone

John Stone Stone worked as an early telephone engineer and was influential in developing wireless communication technology, and obtained dozens of key patents in the field of "space telegraphy". Patents of Stone for radio, together with their equivalents in other countries, form a very voluminous contribution to the patent literature of the subject. Throughout his life, Stone was granted over 70 patents. In many cases these specifications are learned contributions to the literature of the subject, filled with valuable references to other sources of information.

Stone has had issued to him a large number of patents embracing a method for impressing oscillations on a radiator system and emitting the energy in the form of waves of predetermined length whatever may be the electrical dimensions of the oscillator. On 8 February 1900, he filed for a selective system in U.S. patent 714,756. In this system, two simple circuits are associated inductively, each having an independent degree of freedom, and in which the restoration of electric oscillations to zero potential the currents are superimposed, giving rise to compound harmonic currents which permit the resonator system to be syntonized with precision to the oscillator. Stone's system, as stated in U.S. patent 714,831, developed free or unguided simple harmonic electromagnetic signal waves of a definite frequency to the exclusion of the energy of signal waves of other frequencies, and an elevated conductor and means for developing therein forced simple electric vibrations of corresponding frequency. In these patents Stone devised a multiple inductive oscillation circuit with the object of forcing on the antenna circuit a single oscillation of definite frequency. In the system for receiving the energy of free or unguided simple harmonic electromagnetic signal waves of a definite frequency to the exclusion of the energy of signal waves of other frequencies, he claimed an elevated conductor and a resonant circuit associated with said conductor and attuned to the frequency of the waves, the energy of which is to be received. A coherer made on what is called the Stone system was employed in some of the portable wireless outfits of the United States Army. The Stone Coherer has two small steel plugs between which are placed loosely packed carbon granules. This is a self-decohering device; though not as sensitive as other forms of detectors it is well suited to the rough usage of portable outfits.

=== Naval wireless ===
==== Royal Navy ====
In 1897, recently promoted Royal Navy Captain Henry Jackson became the first person to achieve ship-to-ship wireless communications and demonstrated continuous communication with another vessel up to three miles away. HMS Hector became the first British warship to have wireless telegraphy installed when she conducted the first trials of the new equipment for the Royal Navy. Starting in December 1899, HMS Hector and HMS Jaseur were outfitted with wireless equipment. On 25 January 1901, HMS Jaseur received signals from the Marconi transmitter on the Isle of Wight and from HMS Hector (25 January).

==== US Navy ====
In 1899 the United States Navy Board issued a report on the results of investigations of the Marconi system of wireless telegraphy. The report noted that the system was well adapted for use in squadron signalling, under conditions of rain, fog, darkness and motion of speed although dampness affected the performance. They also noted that when two stations were transmitting simultaneously both would be received and that the system had the potential to affect the compass. They reported ranges from 85 miles (137 km) for large ships with tall masts (43 metres, 141 ft) to 7 miles (11 km) for smaller vessels. The board recommended that the system was given a trial by the United States Navy.

== Wireless telephony ==
=== Fessenden ===
In late 1886, Reginald Fessenden began working directly for Thomas Edison at the inventor's new laboratory in West Orange, New Jersey. Fessenden quickly made major advances, especially in receiver design, as he worked to develop audio reception of signals. The United States Weather Bureau began, early in 1900, a systematic course of experimentation in wireless telegraphy, employing him as a specialist. Fessenden evolved the heterodyne principle here where two signals combined to produce a third signal.

In 1900, construction began on a large radio transmitting alternator. Fessenden, experimenting with a high-frequency spark transmitter, successfully transmitted speech on 23 December 1900, over a distance of about 1.6 kilometres (0.99 mi), the first audio radio transmission. Early in 1901 the Weather Bureau officially installed Fessenden at Wier's Point, Roanoke Island, North Carolina, and he made experimental transmissions across water to a station located about 5 miles (8.0 km) west of Cape Hatteras, the distance between the two stations being roughly 50 miles (80 km). An alternator of 1 kW output at 10 kilohertz was built in 1902. The credit for the development of this machine is due to Charles Proteus Steinmetz, Caryl D. Haskins, Ernst Alexanderson, John T. H. Dempster, Henry Geisenhoner, Adam Stein, Jr., and F. P. Mansbendel.

In a paper written by Fessenden in 1902, it was asserted that important advances had been made, one of which was overcoming largely the loss of energy experienced in other systems. In an interview with a New York Journal correspondent, Fessenden stated that in his early apparatus he did not use an air transformer at the sending end, nor a concentric cylinder for emitters and antennae, and had used capacity, but arranged in a manner entirely different from that in other systems, and that he did not employ a coherer or any form of imperfect contact. Fessenden asserted that he had paid particular attention to selective and multiplex systems, and was well satisfied with the results in that direction. On 12 August 1902, 13 patents were issued to Fessenden, covering various methods, devices, and systems for signaling without wires. These patents involved many new principles, the chef-d'oeuvre of which was a method for distributing capacity and inductance instead of localizing these coefficients of the oscillator as in previous systems.

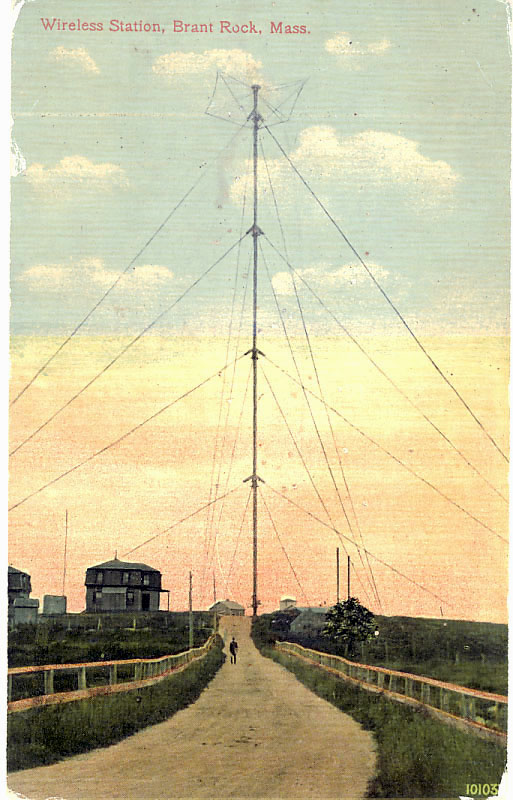
Brant Rock radio tower (1910)

By the summer of 1906, a machine producing 50 kilohertz was installed at the Brant Rock station, and in the fall of 1906, what was called an electric alternating dynamo was working regularly at 75 kilohertz, with an output of 0.5 kW. Fessenden used this for wireless telephoning to Plymouth, Massachusetts, a distance of approximately 11 miles (18 km). In the following year machines were constructed having a frequency of 96 kilohertz and outputs of 1 kW and 2 kW. Fessenden believed that the damped wave-coherer system was essentially and fundamentally incapable of development into a practical system. He would employ a two-phase high frequency alternator method and the continuous production of waves with changing constants of sending circuit. Fessenden would also use duplex and multiplex commutator methods. On 11 December 1906, operation of the wireless transmission in conjunction with the wire lines took place. In July 1907 the range was considerably extended and speech was successfully transmitted between Brant Rock and Jamaica, on Long Island, a distance of nearly 200 miles (320 km), in daylight and mostly over land, the mast at Jamaica being approximately 180 feet (55 m) high.

=== Fleming ===
In November 1904, the English physicist John Ambrose Fleming invented the two-electrode vacuum-tube rectifier, which he called the Fleming oscillation valve. for which he obtained GB patent 24850 and U.S. patent 803,684. This "Fleming Valve" was sensitive and reliable, and so it replaced the crystal diode used in receivers used for long-distance wireless communication. It had an advantage, that it could not be permanently injured or set out of adjustment by any exceptionally strong stray signal, such as those due to atmospheric electricity. Fleming earned a Hughes Medal in 1910 for his electronic achievements. Marconi used this device as a radio detector.

The Supreme Court of the United States would eventually invalidate the US patent because of an improper disclaimer and, additionally, maintained the technology in the patent was known art when filed. This invention was the first vacuum tube. Fleming's diode was used in radio receivers for many decades afterward, until it was superseded by improved solid state electronic technology more than 50 years later.

=== De Forest ===
Lee De Forest had an interest in wireless telegraphy, and he invented the Audion, initially a diode tube, in 1906, and subsequently a triode version in 1908. He was president and secretary of the De Forest Radio Telephone and Telegraph Company (1913). The De Forest System was adopted by the United States Government, and had been demonstrated to other Governments including those of Great Britain, Denmark, Germany, Russia, and British Indies, all of which purchased De Forest apparatus previous to the Great War. De Forest is one of the fathers of the "electronic age", as the Audion helped to usher in the widespread use of electronics.

De Forest made the Audion tube from a vacuum tube. He also made the "Oscillion", an undamped wave transmitter. He developed the De Forest method of wireless telegraphy and founded the American De Forest Wireless Telegraph Company. De Forest was a distinguished electrical engineer and the foremost American contributor to the development of wireless telegraphy and telephony. The elements of his device take relatively weak electrical signals and amplify them. The Audion Detector, Audion Amplifier, and the "Oscillion" transmitter had furthered the radio art and the transmission of written or audible speech. In World War I, the De Forest system was a factor in the efficiency of the United States Signal Service, and was also installed by the United States Government in Alaska.

== Radio invention timeline ==
Below is a brief selection of important events and individuals related to the development of radio, from 1860 to 1910.

== See also ==
People
Edwin Howard Armstrong, Greenleaf Whittier Pickard, Ernst Alexanderson, Archie Frederick Collins, Alexander Stepanovich Popov, Roberto Landell de Moura (Wave Transmitter)
Radio
Radio communication system, Timeline of radio, Oldest radio station, Birth of public radio broadcasting, Crystal radio
Categories
Radio broadcasting people, Radio pioneers, Discovery and invention controversies
Other
List of persons considered father or mother of a field, Radiotelegraph, Spark-gap transmitters, The Great Radio Controversy, Induction coil, Ruhmkorff coil, Poldhu, Alexanderson alternator, De Forest tube, List of radios – List of specific models of radios
