= Mary Texanna Loomis =

American telegrapher and radio expert

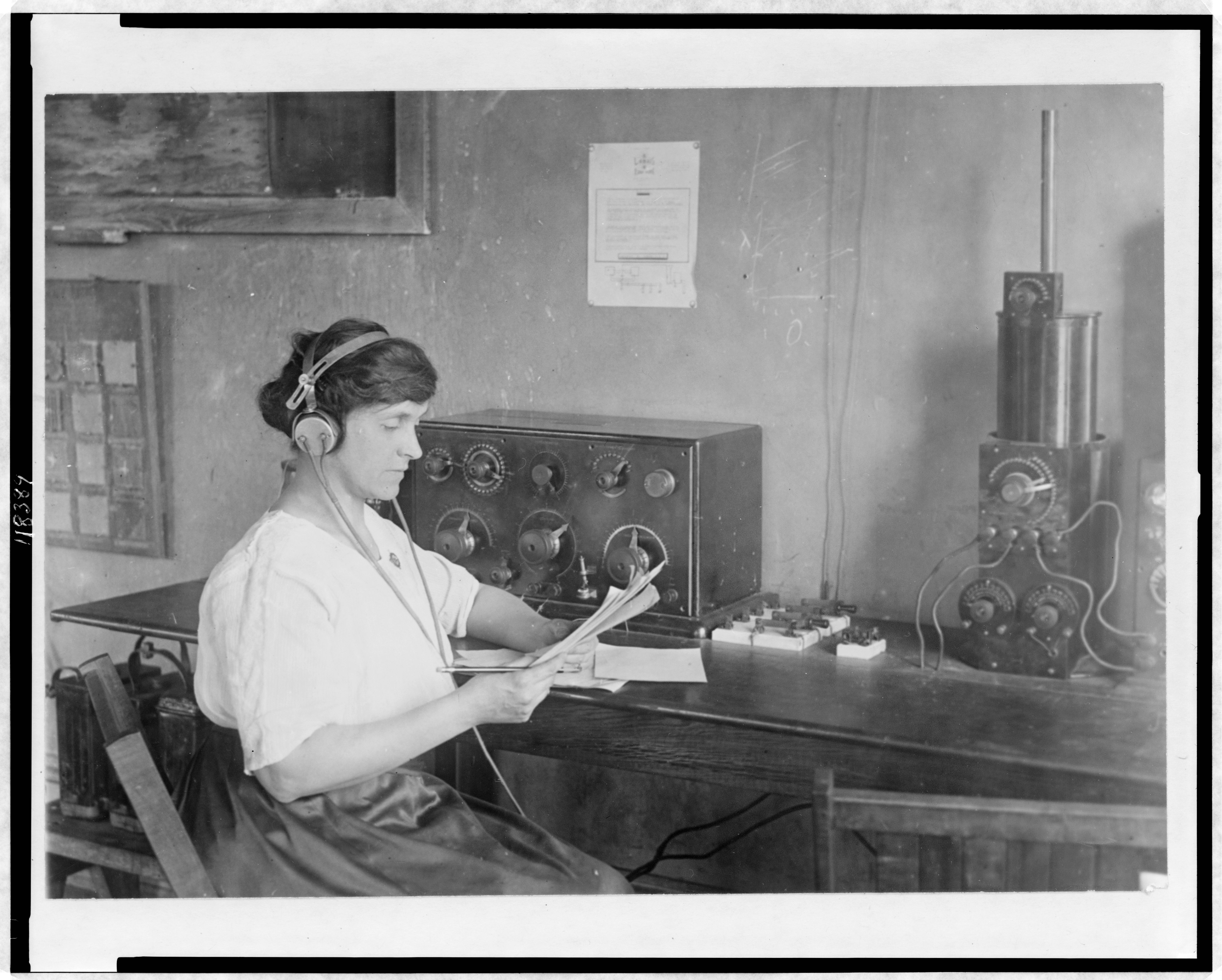
- Mary T. Loomis, seated, with her radio apparatus in the Loomis Radio College, Washington, DC.
- Born: August 18, 1880; Goliad, Texas
- Died: June 7, 1960 (aged 79); San Francisco, California, USA
- Burial place: Woodlawn Memorial Park, Colma, California
- Other name: Mary T. Loomis
- Known for: Telegrapher and expert ham radio operator. Founded The Loomis Radio College.
- Spouse: Turner Loomis
- Parents: Alvin Isaac Loomis (father); Caroline Lucinda Loomis (mother)
- Relatives: Dr. Mahlon Loomis (cousin)
- Website: https://www.geni.com/people/Mary-Loomis/6000000027234490915

Mary Texanna Loomis (born August 18, 1880, near Goliad, Texas) was an early pioneer in the field of radio, best known for founding the Loomis Radio School in Washington, D.C. in 1920, which was later called Loomis Radio College. With an academic background in languages and music, Loomis became interested in wireless telegraphy during World War I, influenced by her cousin, Dr. Mahlon Loomis, an early wireless experimenter. After gaining a license in wireless telegraphy, she sought to honor her ancestor's legacy by establishing a radio school. The Loomis Radio College gained a reputation for excellence, offering comprehensive training and producing graduates who were well-versed in both radio technology and practical skills.

== Early life ==
Mary Texanna Loomis was the second child born to Alvin Isaac and Caroline (Dryer) Loomis. Though born on a homestead in Texas on August 18, 1880, by 1883 her parents had returned to Rochester, New York and then on to Buffalo, New York where Alvin became president of a large delivery and storage company.

Little is known of her early life, but it appears she had a fairly middle-class upbringing. It is believed she was well-schooled, with early interests in music and languages (including mastering French, German, and Italian).

Miss Loomis also had an interest in sports in her youth, including swimming, skating, and horseback riding. Later, she took a course in voice culture and became a talented soprano. She also reportedly went to art school and became adept at sketching.

It is also reported that as a child, she demonstrated a precocious skill with tools. Her grandfather was a strong influence in her life – he taught her to use tools and to build mechanical devices and helped develop her interest in science and the new inventions of the industrial age.

There is a record of a marriage between Ms. Loomis and Turner Erwin in Buffalo, NY when she was age 18, dated October 1898. The marriage ended in divorce in 1917. It is unknown if she had any children.

== During World War I ==
During early World War I, Loomis became interested in the new field of wireless telegraphy while doing Red Cross work and working as a secretary in a wireless school. There was a family precedent; her cousin, Dr. Mahlon Loomis, had conducted early wireless experiments with moderate success. Dr. Loomis was the first person (1865) to both send and receive wireless signals. Miss Loomis mastered wireless telegraphy, becoming competent enough to be granted a license by the United States Department of Commerce in 1919.

After the armistice in 1918, she decided to turn her expertise into a career while also honoring her pioneering ancestor. Her idea was to do this by founding a radio school. Though the field now known as radio was predominantly dominated by men, Loomis founded the Loomis Radio College in Washington, DC in 1920.

== The Loomis Radio College ==
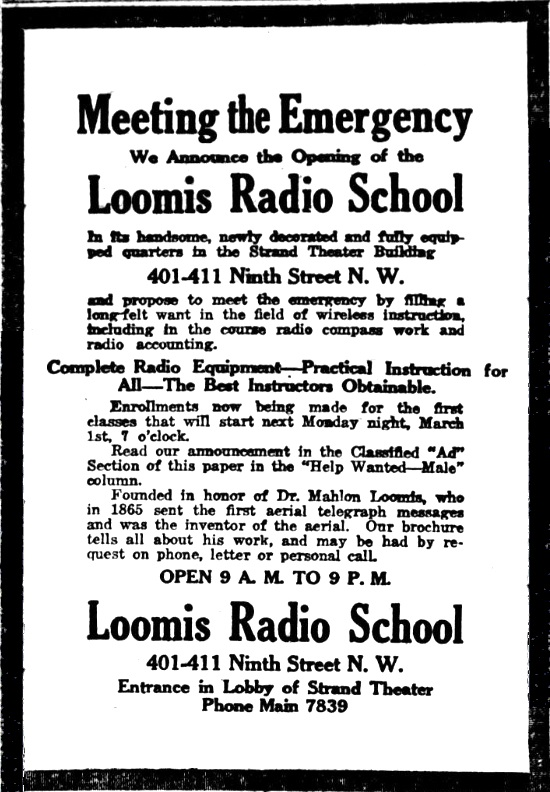
Advertisement for the Loomis Radio School, which appeared on page 4 of the Washington (D.C.) Times on February 26, 1920

The Loomis Radio College quickly gained an excellent reputation. Miss Loomis set high standards for the school, and it attracted students not only from the United States, but Europe and Asia as well. The Loomis College of Radio Engineering was located in Washington, DC, at 401 Ninth Street NW and operated wireless radio 3YA. Miss Loomis was a lecturer, wireless teacher, and author, as well as a member of the prestigious Institute of Radio Engineers. She was also reported to be the principal.

Loomis enjoyed teaching as much as she enjoyed radio itself. In an interview, she said:

Really, I am so infatuated with my work that I delight in spending from 12 to 15 hours at it. My whole heart and soul are in this radio school.

She authored the textbook used at the school, Radio Theory and Operating, today regarded as a classic of early radio technical literature.

The Loomis Radio College offered a six-month course leading to a first-class commercial radio license, and a four-year course leading to a degree in Radio Engineering.

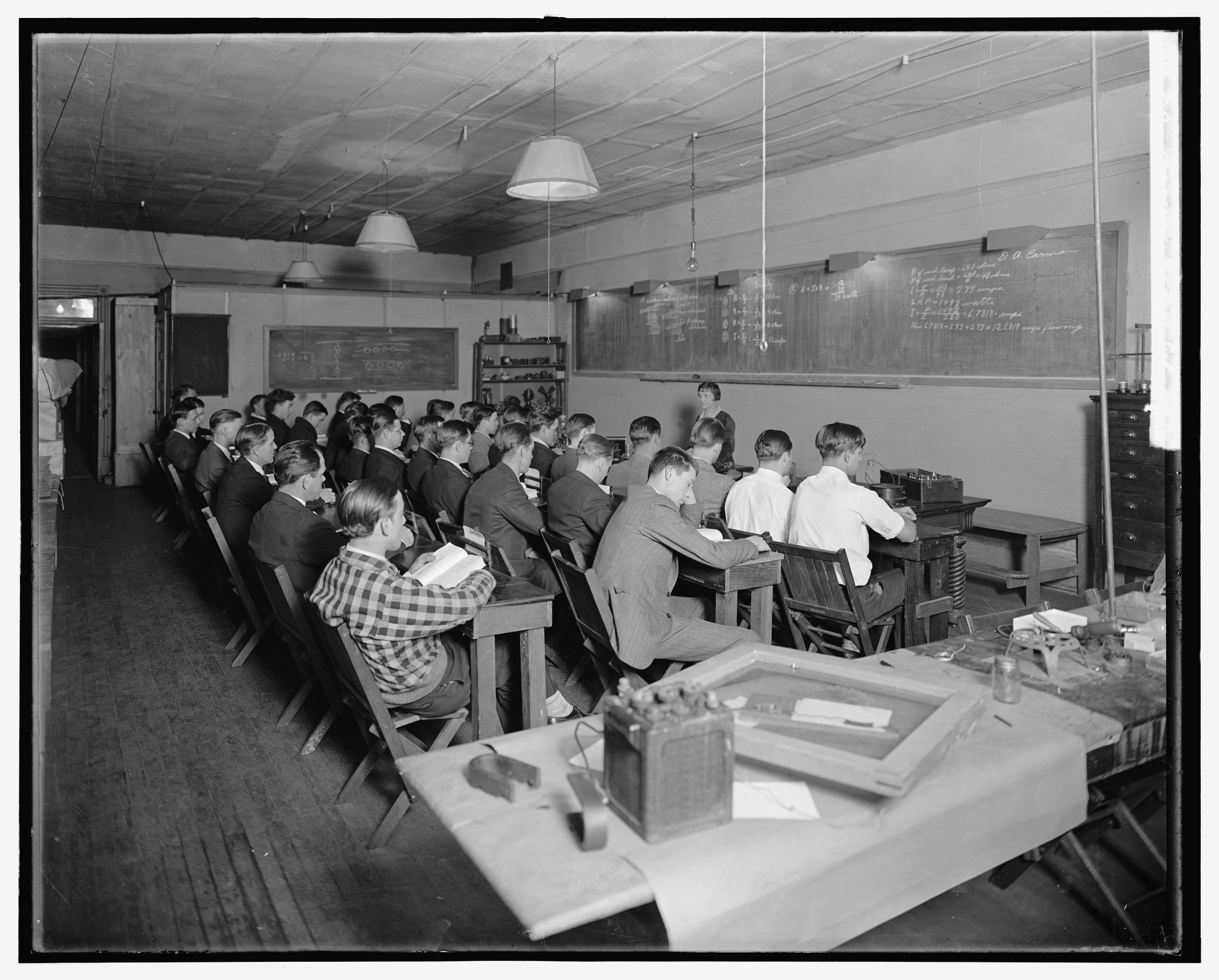
Mary Texanna Loomis, founder and owner of the Loomis Radio School, instructing a class. Washington, D.C., circa 1921.

Miss Loomis also intended that her students understand more than just the inner and outer workings of radio. In addition to a radio laboratory (with equipment constructed almost entirely by Miss Loomis herself), the school maintained a complete shop capable of teaching carpentry, drafting, and basic electricity. She reasoned that many of her graduates might find themselves at sea, or in other challenging situations, and she wanted them adequately prepared.

“No man,” Miss Loomis said at the time, “can graduate from my school until he learns how to make any part of the apparatus. I give him a blueprint of what I want him to do and tell him to go into the shop and keep hammering away until the job is completed.”

It is believed that the depression of 1929 severely affected the school. Fewer students could afford the training, and the larger schools like the National Radio Institute had more resources to weather the hard times. Further, a new competitor, the Capitol Radio Institute, opened its doors in Washington in 1932. In 1930, she reorganized as the Loomis Radio College, Inc., but it was dissolved February 3, 1933. By 1936, there was no longer any record of her school.

The Loomis Radio College appears to have been in existence at least through the mid-1930s. Some of the last known information from Miss Loomis comes from a Washington Post article, March 15, 1931, entitled: “Mary Loomis “Bosses” Air Students to High Success.” The school radio call (3YA), issued by the FRC to Loomis College, was still in effect in spring 1934 per call book issues. By the fall of 1936, the Loomis-issued call had been removed from all listings. Miss Loomis was listed as living in a DC boarding home in the 1930 census.

In the 1929 bibliography "Occupations for College Women", Loomis College of Radio is listed under "anonymous" as an educational institution offering training for women in radio circa 1923.

== Publications ==
Loomis's most notable publication is Radio Theory and Operating for the Radio Student and Practical Operator, first published in 1927. The textbook was a key resource for aspiring radio operators and engineers, providing foundational knowledge on radio theory, electronics, and practical operation. It went through several editions, with the fourth edition released in 1928. The work contributed to the early training of radio operators in the United States and is considered one of the early comprehensive texts in the field of radio education.

== Later life ==
Little is known about life after the Radio School for Miss Loomis. She is known to have relocated to San Francisco in 1938, where the census shows that she lived in the St. Francis Hotel and listed her occupation as a stenographer. She died in San Francisco on June 7, 1960, at the age of 79, and was buried at the Woodlawn Memorial Park in Colma, California.
