= Mahlon Loomis =

American inventor of radio

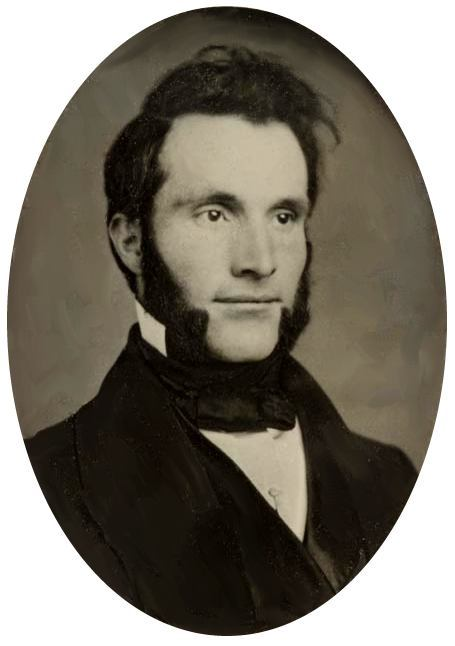
- Mahlon Loomis in about 1865.
- Born: Mahlon Loomis; July 21, 1826; Oppenheim, New York, U.S.
- Died: October 13, 1886 (aged 60); Terra Alta, West Virginia
- Resting place: Terra Alta Cemetery
- Education: science by father (professor)
- Known for: theories on using "atmospheric electricity" for power and wireless telegraph transmissions
- Parent: Professor Nathan Loomis (Harvard)

Mahlon Loomis (21 July 1826 – 13 October 1886) was an American dentist and inventor known for proposing a wireless communication and electric power generating system based on his idea that there were electrically charged layers in the Earth's atmosphere.

Loomis' theory was that the Earth's upper atmosphere was divided into discrete voltage layers, rising from zero at ground level to higher voltage with altitude, and that these could be "tapped" using kites fitted with metallic screen conductors and 600 foot long copper cords, flown high above hills and mountains, in order to conduct electricity for use on the ground or to transmit and receive electromagnetic code impulse messages. He claimed that in 1868, he sent wireless telegraphic transmissions between two Virginia hilltops 18 miles apart using apparatus based on his theories. Historians' takes on what he actually did range from his claim being unproven to theories that he may have inadvertently sent electromagnetic wave (radio) signals between the two hilltops, despite his impractical ideas about atmospheric electrical charges.

== Early life ==
Mahlon Loomis was born in Oppenheim, New York, the third of eight children born to Nathan and Waitie J. (Berber) Loomis. The family later moved to Springvale, Virginia. On May 28, 1856, he married Achsah Ashley; they had a daughter, Catherine Ashley, on August 5, 1860. In September 1848 he moved to Cleveland, Ohio, and studied dentistry under a Dr. Wright, and he began practicing dentistry in Ohio before moving back to Virginia, later residing in Earlville, New York, Cambridgeport, Massachusetts, and Philadelphia, Pennsylvania, before moving to Washington, D.C. In 1860–1862 he was listed as a "master mason" within the Free and Accepted Masons fraternal organization, attending the Dawson Lodge.

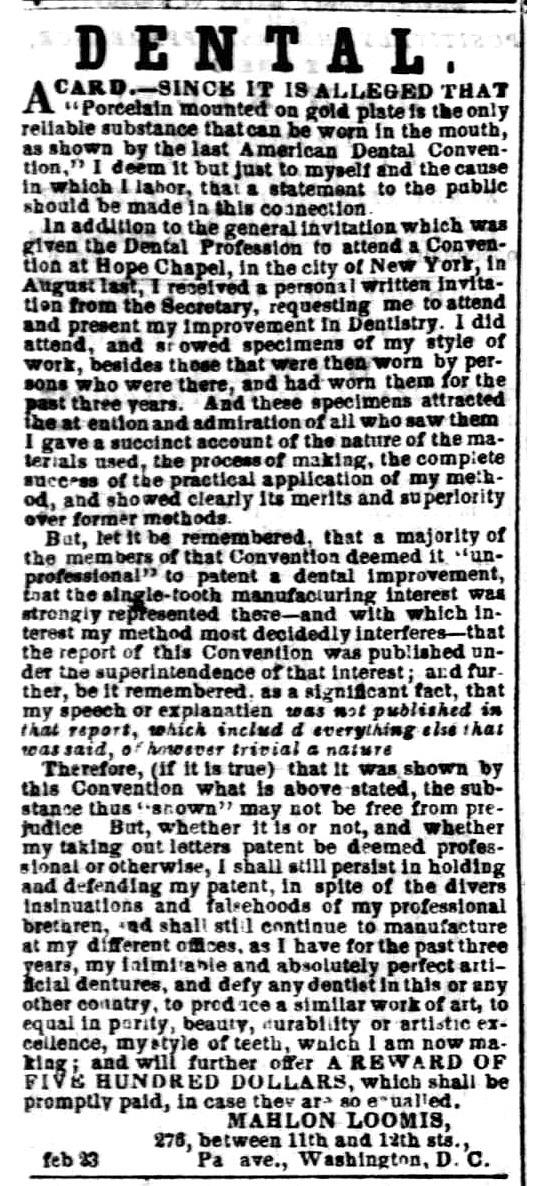
1857 advertisement placed by Loomis defending his patenting of a procedure for making dentures, and offering a $500 reward for anyone producing dentures "so equalled" to his work.

== Dentistry ==
As part of his dentistry practice, Loomis developed a process for making dentures entirely out of porcelain, which he patented in the United States (U.S. patent 10,847) in 1857, as well as in England and France. However, patenting a medical device was controversial, and a New York dental convention deemed the action "unprofessional". In response Loomis took out advertisements in local newspapers defending his dental patent and himself against the "unprofessional" charge, stating: "whether my taking out letters patent be deemed professional or otherwise, I shall still persist in holding and defending my patent, in spite of the divers insinuations and falsehoods of my professional brethren, and shall still continue to manufacture at my different offices, as I have for the past three years, my inimitable and absolutely perfect artificial dentures, and defy any dentist in this or any other country, to produce a similar work of art, to equal in purity, beauty, durability or artistic excellence, my style of teeth, which I am now making; and will further offer A REWARD OF FIVE HUNDRED DOLLARS, which shall be promptly paid, in case they are so equalled.

An historical review of Loomis's patent concluded that he "had great confidence in the ultimate success of his process, and regarded it as easy of manipulation and adaptation. But the profession encountered very great difficulties with it in these directions, principal among them being the almost impossibility of properly governing the shrinkage of the material in firing; and Mr. Loomis's process, although experimented with to some extent, never attained too much importance."

== Atmospheric electricity ==
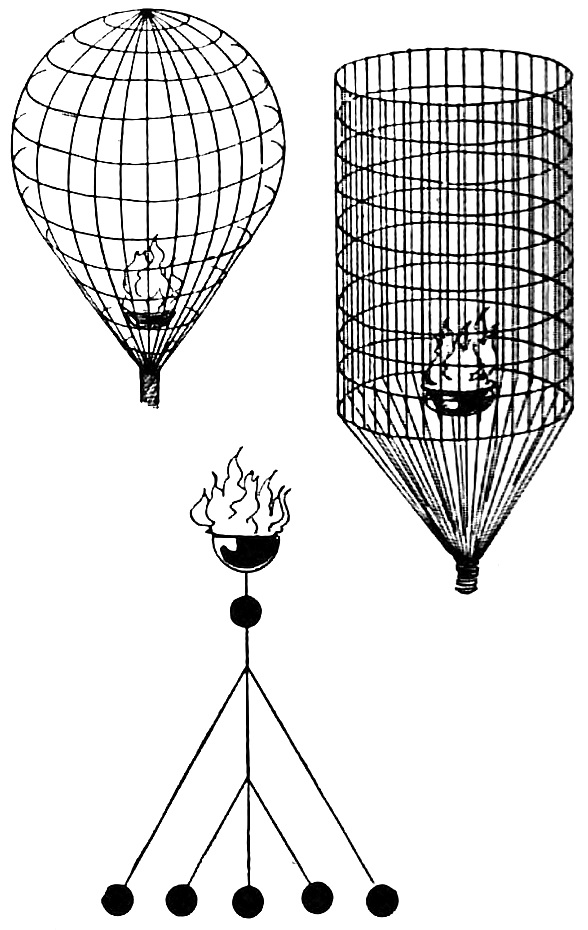
In addition to using kites and gilt-covered balloons, Loomis's notebooks included illustrations of ideas for using elevated open flames.

In the mid-1800s it had been well established that the Earth was surrounded by a significant electrical field, and Loomis felt passionately that this was an overlooked resource of vast potential, both for generating electrical power, and as a conduit that would support worldwide wireless communication.

In 1864, Loomis mused in his notebook: "The lightning with its thunder crash seems to be the most powerful and terrible thing in nature. There always seems to be an abundance of this electrical element; and why not use it for various purposes?" In an 1872 lecture he prophesied: "The atmosphere, like the inside of a Leyden jar, or the zinc plate of a galvanic battery, is always highly charged with positive electricity, and the intervening air, like the glass of the Leyden jar, or the separated poles of the galvanic battery, is a perfect non-conductor, thus forming and constituting the most complete and colossal electric battery that ever gave an electric spark, but standing all unused. ... there is one way already demonstrated by experiments by which we can reach, and avail sources of its benefit and value, and that is to seek the highest mountain tops, and thus penetrate this immense and unexplored field, whose virgin soil awaits the plowshare for a fruitful seedtime and harvest". Loomis noted that: "Franklin demonstrated the practicability of drawing electricity from the clouds to the earth, but not one step has since been taken to pursue that fact to a profitable practice." But, once the infrastructure for drawing electrical currents from the upper atmosphere was in place, it would mean that: "mill and factory will then run with a more subtle power, although the waterwheel stands dry and idle. Our dwellings will glow with wholesome heat on wintry days and be illuminated with clear, unwavering light in the night time from the steady and exhaustless flow of this vital element, and the miner of coal shall leave his toil in the shaft for a nobler handicraft among his fellows up in the sunlight and the world. The crude gold of Ophir may lie in the ground, but the pure smelted metal of Omnipotence lies in the stratum over it." In this same lecture Loomis maintained that harnessing atmospheric electricity would someday be used to melt icebergs, result in "malaria cleared from the atmosphere" and eventually be used to make "the entire climates of this our planet toned and tempered".

Another electrical phenomenon that greatly influenced Loomis's theories was the aurora borealis or "Northern Lights". As early as 1839 the German mathematician and physicist Carl Friedrich Gauss had correctly speculated that its luminescence was originating in an electrically conducting region of the upper atmosphere, which later became known as ionosphere. Loomis was familiar with the solar storm of 1859, which in addition to a major aurora display produced widespread surging electrical currents which disrupted telegraph lines. However, at this time the exact height of the phenomenon was uncertain. Although it is now known to be located hundreds of kilometers above sea level, Loomis believed it was actually only a few kilometers above the Earth's surface, thus well within the range of the highest mountain summits.

=== Wireless telegraphy and telephony ===
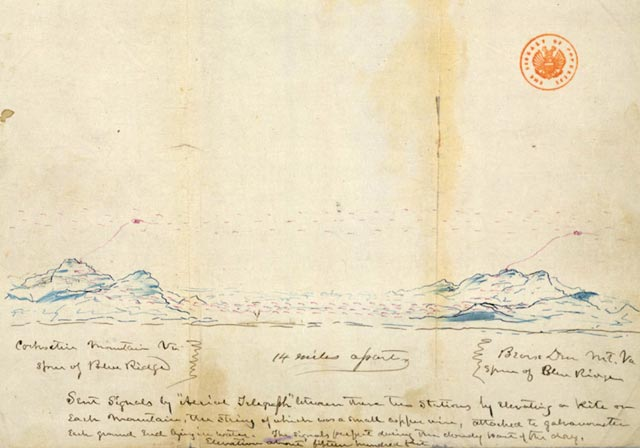
Drawing made by Mahlon Loomis, circa 1866, in one of his notebooks, illustrating what he described as a successful wireless transmission experiment made in October of that year in Virginia, spanning 18 miles (29 kilometers) between Bear's Den mountain and an unspecified peak in the Catoctin Mountain range.

Reflecting his belief in the tremendous untapped potential of atmospheric electricity, Loomis declared in a January 1868 letter to his brother Joseph: "Telegraph! That's the least important result I expect to attain". However, virtually all his reported ensuing efforts dealt with attempts to establish long-distance signalling.

Loomis believed that, in the absence of disrupting influences like thunderstorms, the atmosphere normally arranged itself into discrete concentric layers, which could be individually accessed in order to provide distant wireless communication. Therefore, transmissions would only be possible when both the sending and receiving conductors were at the same altitude above sea level. There were a number of instances in the years between 1866 and 1879 where Loomis was reported making successful experimental transmissions, ranging from 11 to 400 miles (18 to 645 kilometers). However, in most cases the details provided were very limited.

Loomis is best known for an entry for October 1866 that he recorded in one of his notebooks, which reads: "From two mountain peaks of the Blue Ridge in Virginia, which are only about two thousand feet above tide-water, two kites were let up—one from each summit—eighteen or twenty miles apart. These kites had each a small piece of fine copper wire gauze about fifteen inches square attached to their under-side and connected also with the wire six hundred feet in length which held the kites when they were up. The day was clear and cool in the month of October, with breeze enough to hold the kites firmly at anchor when they were flown. Good connection was made with the ground by laying in a wet place a coil of wire one end of which was secured to the binding post of a galvanometer. The equipments and apparatus at both stations were exactly alike; it was arranged that at precisely such an hour and minute the galvanometer at one station should be attached, to be in circuit with the ground and kite wires. At the opposite station the ground wire, being already fast to the galvanometer, three separate and deliberate half-minute connections were made with the kite wire and the instrument. This deflected or moved the needle at the other station with the same vigor and precision as if it had been attached to an ordinary battery. After a lapse of five minutes, as previously arranged, the same performance was repeated with the same results until the third time. Then fifteen minutes precisely were allowed to elapse, during which time the instrument at the first station was put in circuit with both wires while the opposite one was detached from its upper wire, thus reversing the arrangements at each station. At the expiration of the fifteen minutes the message or signals came in to the initial station, a perfect duplicate of those sent from it, as by previous agreement. And although no 'transmitting key' was made use of, nor any 'sounder' to voice the messages, yet they were just as exact and distinct as any that ever traveled over a metallic conductor. A solemn feeling seemed to be impressed upon those who witnessed the little performance as if some grave mystery hovered there around the simple scene, notwithstanding the results were confidently expected, although the experiments had been continued for nearly two days before the line would 'work,' and even then it continued to transmit signals only about three hours, when the circuit became suddenly inoperative by the moving away of the upper electric body. Hence it is that high regions must be sought where disturbing influences cannot invade, where statical energy is stored in a vast unbroken element, enabling a line to be worked without interruption or possible failure. No speculation need be indulged as to whether the theory is correct, for theory and speculation must stand aside whether they will or not, and square themselves with the demonstrated truth."

A November 1872 report in the Washington Chronicle stated that, using kites and galvanometers, "Loomis' aërial system has just been tried on lines of different lengths, with variable, but perfectly satisfactory results. On a line of 400 miles lineal distance (800 mile circuit) the tests were perfectly satisfactory at an elevation of 2100 feet. At a mountain elevation of 1200 feet the tests and results that were very strong at a distance of 14 miles." In a January 1873 interview printed in the same paper, Loomis was quoted as saying that during the previous summer he had "telegraphed by my imperfect experiments in the most satisfactory manner", "on the spurs of the Blue Ridge Mountains, in Virginia, at a mountain elevation of about thirteen hundred feet, with kites let up with a small copper wire of about five hundred feet in length. The signals were perfect, as indicated with a galvanometer at the two stations, when the connection was made with the earth completing the circuit".

Fifteen years after Mahlon Loomis's death, his older brother George wrote an account about his brother's activities. George Loomis reported that a series of financial setbacks had hindered development. A plan to raise $20,000 to finance a demonstration of the system in the U.S. Cascade Range, spanning the 300 miles (480 kilometers) between Mount Hood, Oregon, and Mount Shasta, California, had to be canceled due to losses encountered by the backers in the September 1869 Black Friday stock market crash. Alternate financing for this test was then arranged from a group located in Chicago, but this support also was blocked, due to the aftereffects of the October 1871 Great Chicago Fire.

George Loomis's account also related an underwater test performed by his brother: "Pursuing the theories the correctness of which had already been so satisfactorily verified, he conceived the idea of telegraphing between vessels at sea without wire connections. The experiment was tried on the Chesapeake Bay with perfect success, between ships about two miles apart." "On each vessel was a telegraphic apparatus. A wire was attached to the instrument and one end thrown into the water to a moderate depth. Another insulated wire of much greater length was let down to a greater depth into a colder stratum of water. The two strata of water of different temperatures thus connected to the same battery made a complete circuit, and enabled communications to pass between the two vessels without other connections. The experiment resulted in complete success. On the same principle he was led to believe that the warm current of the Gulf Stream, if similarly connected with the adjacent colder water, would afford a means of telegraphing a great distance—perhaps as far as a decided difference in temperature is maintained." This apparently is the only report of Loomis making an underwater trial.

=== Congressional activities ===
On January 13, 1869, Senator Charles Sumner of Massachusetts submitted a petition prepared by Loomis that requested that the U.S. Congress appropriate $50,000 for financing for developing his ideas "during the next year". This petition was initially referred to the Committee on Patents, then at Loomis's request was rereferred on March 11, 1870, to the Committee on Appropriations. Twenty days later the petition was again transferred, to the Committee on Commerce.

Loomis's request for a government appropriation had a precedent in an 1843 congressional grant of $30,000 to Samuel Morse, for the construction of an experimental wire telegraph line from Washington to Baltimore, Maryland. During the time Congress was evaluating this request, Morse conducted multiple onsite demonstrations of the telegraph's operation at the capitol building. In addition, the House Committee on Commerce, reviewing his proposal, noted that there was a similar telegraph system, developed by Charles Wheatstone, that was already in commercial operation in England, which had been "put into practical use for two or three hundred miles in Great Britain". This led the committee to conclude that "The practicality of establishing telegraphs on the electric principle is no longer a question."

In contrast, there was little beyond Loomis's enthusiasm to support his assertion that it was possible to construct working aerial telegraph stations on mountaintops. Senator Sumner, when submitting Loomis's request, explained that: "In presenting this petition I desire to say that I perform a duty, and I content myself with remarking that it is certainly a great case of moonshine or it marks a great epoch in the progress of invention. I do not undertake to express an opinion upon it." Kansas senator Samuel Pomeroy did state that "I hope Senators will not think from any remarks I have made that I sneered at this improvement. I believe in it. I have seen two or three experiments, and I think there is something in it. I have seen it tested in a small way, and I am inclined to think it will succeed." However he did not provide any additional details as to what he meant by "tested in a small way". Ultimately Loomis's petition for financial support was not approved.

Rebuffed in obtaining federal financing, Loomis concluded that forming a corporation under a federal charter would help increase the visibility of his efforts, and would be more likely to be approved, since the federal government would not have to spend any money. Thus, on July 11, 1870, a bill was introduced by John Bingham of Ohio in the House of Representatives to incorporate the Loomis Aerial Telegraph Company, which under the proposed charter would be used "to utilize the principles and powers of natural electricity in telegraphing, generating light, heat and motive power". The incorporators were Loomis, Alex Elliott and William N. Chamberlain of Washington, D.C., P. R. Ammidon of Boston, and Isaiah Dukens of Delaware. The initial capital to be raised by stock sales was set at $200,000, which could be raised if needed to $2 million. This bill would be submitted three times in as many years, failing to be passed the first two times, and on each occasion was referred to the Committee on Commerce.

On May 20, 1872, representative Bingham submitted "An Act to incorporate the Loomis Aerial Telegraph Company" for a third time, again stressing that there would be no monetary appropriation. At the time the bill was submitted, Bingham stated: "I have introduced the bill at the instance of the gentleman (Mr. Loomis) whose name it bears. My acquaintance with this gentleman is very limited." "He entertains a dream, and it may be only a dream, a wild dream, that when his proposition comes to be fully applied, it may light and warm your houses, that it may furnish all the heat needful for all the uses of human life, and to propel your machinery upon the land and upon the sea." This time the bill was passed by the House of Representatives, and on January 16, 1873, the U.S. Senate also gave its approved. President Grant signed the bill five days later.

Following the signing, The Telegrapher reported that "Our old friend Prof. Loomis has at last got his act of incorporation passed and is comparatively happy", although in the opinion of the skeptical reviewer "The whole thing will probably subside and be forgotten after a little while". J. R. Hayes, M.D., one of the investors in the Loomis Aerial Telegraph Company, penned a positive review that appeared in a number of newspapers. In his opinion: "The conception of Dr. Loomis is a grand one, and worth the profound attention of all his countrymen. It is a far more feasible plan, in view of our present knowledge of electricity as applied to telegraphy, than was the Morse system at its conception." Moreover, he predicted that "This system will revolutionize telegraphy all over the world as it is practically developed and utilized, and so inexpensive will it be in its daily operation that it will soon supersede the postal system of all countries without the aid of legislation to this effect."

=== Patent ===
While the attempts to have the incorporation bill approved were ongoing, Loomis, at the suggestion of representative Bingham, applied for a patent covering his idea. On July 30, 1872, he was issued U.S. patent 129,971 for "Improvement in Telegraphing". This one-page patent makes a vague claim about using atmospheric electricity to eliminate the overhead wire used by the existing telegraph systems, but it contains no schematic diagram of how to build it, and no theory of how it might function. Loomis envisioned towers "on the tops of high mountains, and thus penetrate or establish electrical connection with the atmospheric stratum ... to form the electrical circuit."

Loomis's patent is actually similar to U.S. patent 126,356, issued to William Henry Ward three months earlier. Ward, who apparently was acquainted with Loomis and his ideas, applied for his patent, "Improvement in Collecting Electricity for Telegraphing, &c.", on June 29, 1871, and it was granted on April 30, 1872. Ward's description envisioned intercontinental signalling, but does not include a detailed schematic diagram. Instead, it illustrates and describes towers that can be rotated into the wind in order "to drive an aerial current of electricity into the insulated middle portion of the tower, which current passes upwardly through the upper portion of the tower and out through the ventilator or the top ... whereby the tower is receiving continually fresh and new supplies of electricity".

The two patents in some places use almost identical language:

"I entirely dispense with artificial batteries, forming my circuit merely by connecting the aerial current with the earth current ... for the use of land lines of telegraphs or for other purposes, such as light, heat, &c." (Ward)

"I also dispense with all artificial batteries, but use the free electricity of the atmosphere, co-operating with that of the earth ... for telegraphing and for other purposes, such as light, heat, and motive power." (Loomis)

Despite the existence of the earlier Ward patent, most historical reviews still credit Loomis as being the first individual to receive a patent for wireless electronic communication.

=== Later development ===
Loomis now held a patent, and the Loomis Aerial Telegraph Company had a federal charter, but there appears to have been little corporate activity beyond an organizational meeting. Ernest Newton Boog placed much of the blame on the inactivity on the Panic of 1873, which occurred in September of that year, and "ruined most of the very capitalists who had agreed to back him".

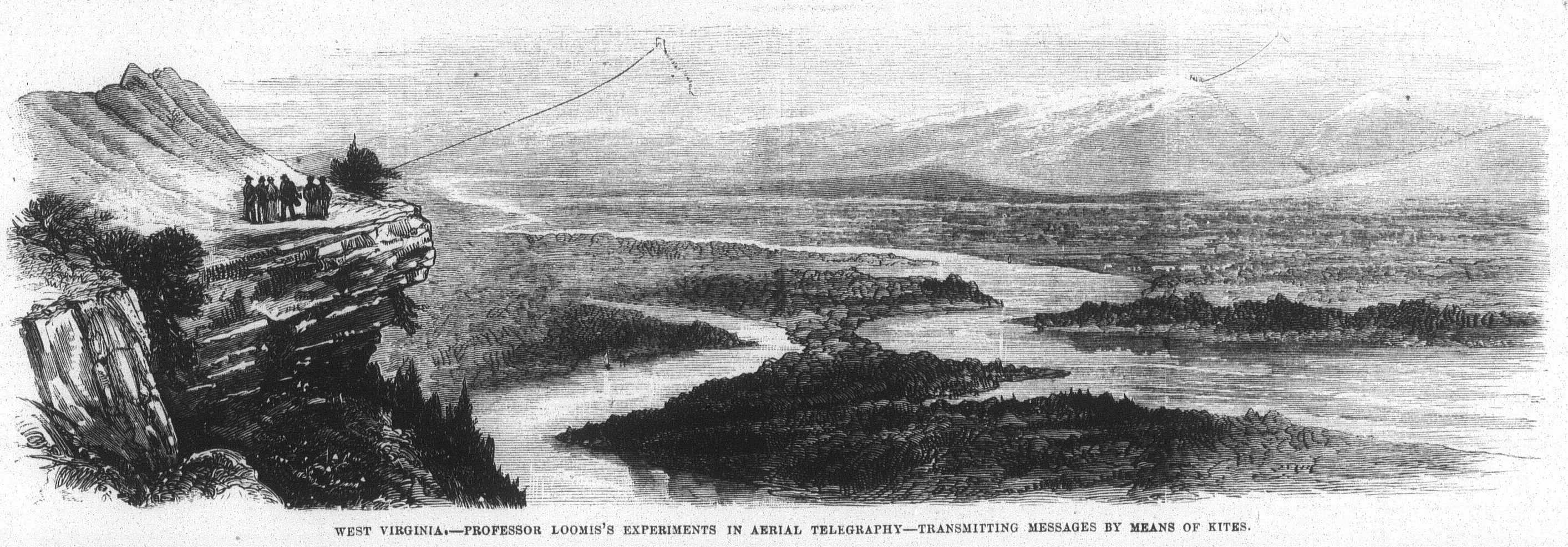
Illustration included in the December 29, 1877, issue of Frank Leslie's Illustrated Newspaper of how a recently reported West Virginia demonstration by Loomis might have appeared.

However, in late 1877 it was reported that Loomis was now conducting successful experiments in West Virginia, and also had the financing needed to test a bold plan to connect the western United States with Switzerland. According to this report, carried in numerous papers: "Information has reached here recently that Professor Loomis, who has been in the mountainous regions of West Virginia for some months conducting a series of experiments with his proposed aerial telegraphy, has demonstrated finally that telegraphing without wires is practical." Furthermore, "Professor Loomis has a scheme now on foot for a series of experiments from a point on one of the highest peaks on the Alps, in Switzerland, to a similarly situated place in the Rocky Mountains, on this side of the world. If this succeeds, of course, the invention will rank in importance with that of the electric telegraph itself, and be even greater than that of the telephone. All of the money necessary to carry on the experiments has already been promised, and it will not be many years, if it turns out to be a success, before ocean cables will be one of the lost arts, as having played its part, it will be laid aside. The cost of aerial telegraphy will not be over one cent when the other is $1,000."

In early 1879, a report attributed to the Hartford Times Washington correspondent was carried in a number of newspapers and periodicals. This review stated that Loomis was continuing tests in West Virginia "conducted from high hills and mountains though he has telegraphed as far as eleven miles by having kites raised at each end of the distance, flying them with a fine copper wire instead of string. The instant they reached the same exact altitude or got into the same current telegraphic communications, by aid of an instrument similar to the Morse instrument, could be carried on as perfectly as if the two kites were connected with wires. The lowering of one kite would, however, break off the communication immediately." Given the need to keep the tops of the two conductors at fixed identical heights, this report continued that "Accordingly he built a kind of telescopic tower at the tops of two hills about twenty miles distant, and from them put up a steel rod by which a certain aerial current of electricity was reached. For months at a time he has been able to telegraph from one tower to another. A heavy storm disarranges the connection, but it can be readily restored after the storm has passed." A postscript to this account, sourced to the Washington Chronicle, stated that Loomis had reported that he had "demonstrated by repeated tests that the telephone could be used as easily as the Morse instruments, and that lately he had done all his talking to his assistant, twenty miles away from him, by the telephone, the connection being aerial only". In addition, Loomis was quoted as saying he had "been in correspondence with Edison for a long time, and that he had received many valuable hints from him".

=== Critiques of Loomis's wireless telegraph and telephone claims ===
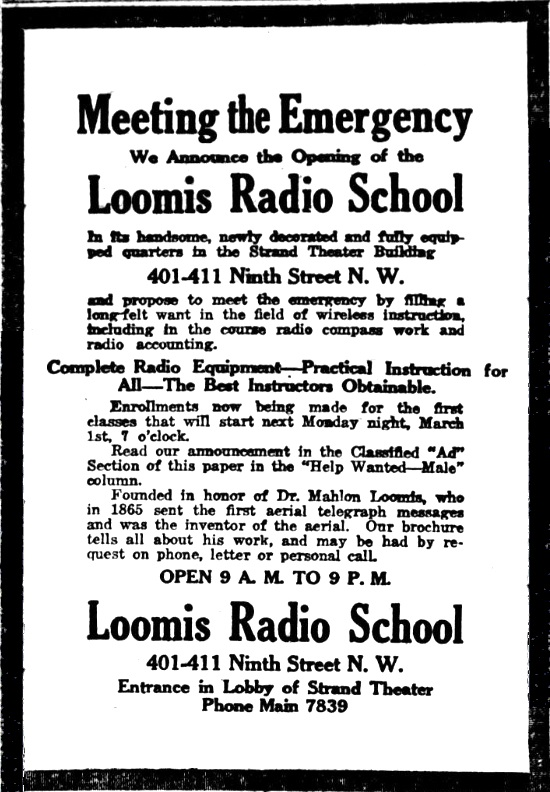
The Loomis Radio School in Washington, D.C., was founded in 1920 by Mary Texanna Loomis "in honor of Dr. Mahlon Loomis".

Loomis assertion that, beginning in the 1860s, he successfully conducted long range wireless telegraph and telephone communication, is controversial, and opinions about his claims range from full acceptance to dismissal as being unproven and impractical. In general even individuals accepting his reports assume that the transmissions didn't work in the way his patent specified. Instead of signaling produced by electrical changes that were induced in atmospheric stratifications, supporters generally hypothesize that he was actually inadvertently sending and receiving radio signals. (It was not until the mid-1890s, through the work of Guglielmo Marconi, that it became known that high frequency electrical currents could be used to generate radio signals (electromagnetic radiation) for signaling purposes.)

The lack of independent witnesses or detailed technical descriptions has made it difficult to make a conclusive analysis of Loomis's various assertions and ideas. During this era the common practice for verifying that a system was working as advertised was to post observers at each end of a communication link, sending their own messages and making public reports. Although Loomis claimed that "eminent scientists and engineers" observed his experiments, he never provided their names or those of his assistants, and extensive research has not uncovered any independent reports by eyewitnesses.

Skepticism about Loomis's ideas date back to his earliest work. In 1869, the year he petitioned the U.S. Congress for financial support, and from 1870 to 1873, when he was endeavoring to receive the charter for the Loomis Aerial Telegraph Company, newspaper commentary was often very negative. An editorial comment in the January 15, 1869, Paterson Daily Gardian stated "We incline to think that Mr. Summer is both sound and safe in saying of Mahon Loomis, M.D.'s new mode of 'telegraphing without the use of wires,' that it is either a great case of moonshine or else it marks an epoch in the progress of invention.' But before that 'appropriation of $50,000' is passed, it may be well to find out which."

For the "Telegraphy" entry in the 1903 edition of the Encyclopædia Britannica, contributor John Ambrose Fleming wrote that: "Many other more or less imperfect devices—such as those of Mahlon Loomis, put forward in 1872 and 1877, and Kitsee in 1895—for wireless telegraphy were not within the region of practically realizable schemes." In 1904, A. T. Story surveyed the available information, and felt the need to include the qualifier "if we are to believe the reports", before stating that then "the attempt to communicate between the two summits was successful". In 1907 Lucien Poincaré authored a comprehensive overview of "modern physics" which flatly dismissed Loomis's self-reported successes as not even being worthy of review, and the English translation of this book added the pejorative description of Loomis as "an American quack".

In 1909 a Washington Star article reported that a proposal was under review by the U.S. Weather Bureau to conduct tests, using kites, to try to verify Loomis's experiments. The paper noted that: "The facts in the case have been transmitted by Prof. Willis Moore to Dr. Blair, who is carrying on a series of kite-flying experiments at Mount Weather, and he will try to reproduce the results. The experiment will not cost anything to speak of and possibly will be of value. The officials of the Smithsonian who know something of the records in the Loomis case are not enthusiastic over the revival of the old story. Mr. Mayard, who has charge of the technical work, says that he has never found what was to him satisfactory evidence that Loomis actually accomplished anything. He says that if he could find any of his instruments he would be glad to add them to the Smithsonian collection, but that he has never heard of there being such relics in existence." (Research conducted by Thomas Appleby did not find any information to confirm that these proposed Weather Bureau experiments ever took place, however, equipment used by Loomis was later acquired by Smithsonian.)

In 1922, the authors of The Complete Book of Radio were intrigued by Loomis's work, although they prefaced their review with the comment that they were "by no means asserting that Loomis discovered radio telegraphy, as we understand it today". After analyzing Loomis's papers, they concluded that "it is very difficult to give Loomis's notes the proper interpretation", and "even the most thoughtful consideration does not seem to reveal the facts that he had in mind". In addition, they found that his patent "specifications, in the light of our present-day knowledge, are so ambiguous that it is difficult to get their real meaning". Given the lack of information, they concluded it was unclear whether he had employed the high-frequency electrical currents later determined to be necessary to generate radio signals, on the other hand, "It cannot be said with certainty that he did not use such currents."

Others, however, considered Loomis to be a misunderstood prophet who was thirty years before his time, and who should be credited with having invented wireless telegraphy "two years before the birth of Marconi".

With the approach of the centennial of his reported October 1866 demonstration, a group of supporters worked to commemorate Loomis. A short article by Otis B. Young of Southern Illinois University, "The Real Beginning of Radio: the Neglected Story of Mahlon Loomis", appeared in the March 7, 1964, issue of Saturday Review. Young produced a longer review in 1967, whose open sentence asserted that "Mahlon Loomis was beyond reasonable doubt the discoverer and inventor of wireless communication in the world." Congressional acknowledgement of Loomis was proposed through Senate Joint Resolution 111, submitted September 20, 1965, by Senator Robert Byrd, and House Joint Resolution 685, submitted October 7, 1965, by Representative Howard W. Smith, both of Virginia, which sought to recognize Loomis as being "the first person to invent and demonstrate a system of wireless communication". However, neither resolution was passed.

The October 1965 issue of Popular Electronics printed an article, "The Real Inventor of Wireless", authored by Thomas Appleby and on March 15, 1967, Appleby founded the non-profit "Mahlon Loomis Scientific Foundation, Inc." in Washington, D.C., "dedicated to scientific research in the name of Mahlon Loomis". He also prepared a more extensive review of Loomis's life, Mahlon Loomis: Inventor of Radio, which was published in 1967.

Appleby's overall conclusion was that Loomis had successfully made multiple wireless telegraphic transmissions beginning in 1866, and, based on his analysis of Loomis notebooks, he had inadvertently created a "spark-gap" radio transmitter, similar to what early radio inventors would employ a few decades later. According to Appleby, the elevated wires would have created electrical sparks (despite the fact that Loomis had contrasted the crashing of lightning with his own system, which he stated would work "innocuously and without jar"), which in turn produced radiotelegraphic transmissions. (A spark transmitter would have been incapable of making audio transmissions, but Appleby did not address Loomis's 1879 assertion that he was using his aerial system to regularly talk to an assistant twenty miles away). Loomis reported that he used elevated conductors including kites to reach what he theorized was a conducting layer in the atmosphere. Appleby concluded that the kites' copper strings would have acted as radio transmitting and receiving antennas, and the fact that they were reported to be identical lengths would have added a limited amount of tuning.

Reviewing the reported 1866 test, Appleby noted that although Loomis stated that one site was Bear's Den mountain, the other location was only said to be eighteen miles distant, somewhere along the Catoctin Ridge. (In some other accounts the stated distances range from fourteen to twenty miles). Using the eighteen mile figure, Appleby suggested that the second site might be Furnace Mountain, because any further north would be across the Potomac River in Maryland instead of Virginia.

Appleby noted that one question sometimes raised was how Loomis, if he actually was transmitting radio signals, could have used a galvanometer to receive the signals, as these devices were well known to be activated only by direct electrical currents, and unusable for the high-frequency alternating currents produced by received radio signals. (The first recorded use of a galvanometer to receive radio signals was by John Fleming in 1904. However, he used a two element vacuum-tube to convert the high-frequency alternating current to direct current in order to allow the galvanometer to work). Appleby noted that Loomis's notebooks did not include any information about a specific type of galvanometer, and "there are only meager details of the equipment used by Dr. Loomis to receive or detect these oscillations at his receiving station" because "all that he left was a few rough sketches lacking the details of construction". However, he speculated that some sort of magnetic effect could have made it possible for the devices to become effective.

In the 2003 issue of Invention & Technology, the article "Through The Air In 1866" by Malvin E. Ring was sub-titled "Virginia dentist demonstrated wireless telegraphy decades before Marconi". This review accepted Loomis's claims of making long-distance wireless telegraphy transmissions, although the author had outstanding questions about the technical details, stating "How exactly this happened is not clear."

On the other hand, others remain skeptical. In 2005, Thomas H. Lee summarized his research efforts: "Allegedly, experiments conducted by Loomis in his home state of West Virginia were successful, but there is no accepted primary evidence to support this claim, and calculations based on modern knowledge cast tremendous doubt in any case." Moreover: "Seemingly authoritative reports of successful tests abound (in typical accounts, senators from several states are present for the tests, in which two mountaintops 22 km apart is allegedly demonstrated and then independently verified). However, I have never been able to locate information about these tests other than what Loomis himself provided. Others quoting these same results apparently have had no better success locating a primary source, but continue to repeat them without qualification."

== Later life ==
Loomis eventually became estranged from his wife, and by 1878 was working as a mineralogist for the Mount Athos company in Lynchburg, Virginia. On May 10, 1881, he was issued U.S. patent 241,387 for a "convertible valise", and on November 29, 1881, was issued U.S. patent 250,268 for a "cuff or collar fastening". This device consisted of "a strip of metal bent at each end in opposite directions to form spring hooks, having the inner surfaces roughened or serrated and the curved portions corrugated." He moved to his brother George's home in Parkersburg, West Virginia, then in 1884 moved to Terra Alta, West Virginia, where he set up a dental practice. On March 16, 1886, he was issued U.S. patent 338,090, for a type of electrical thermostat. Loomis died at Terra Alta on October 13, 1886, at the age of 60, and was buried in the Terra Alta Cemetery.

George Loomis reported that near the end of his life, Mahlon recounted that "an impulse has driven me that I could not resist" and "I know that I am by some, even many, regarded as a crank—by some perhaps as a fool—for allowing myself to the sacrifice of material advantages to abandon a lucrative profession and pursue this ignus fatuus, but I know that I am right, and if the present generation lives long enough their opinions will be changed—and their wonder will be that they did not perceive it before. I shall never see it perfected—but it will be, and others will have the honor of the discovery. Still, I do not care for that—except it would be gratifying I confess, to live to see the world acknowledge that I am at least sane; or at least such a crank as God employs to move the world."
