= HMS Jaseur =

Six ships of the Royal Navy have borne the name HMS Jaseur, the name coming from the French for the waxwing.

- HMS Jaseur (1807) was a 12-gun brig-sloop that Bombay captured off the Andaman Islands in 1807. She foundered, with the loss of her whole crew, in 1808.
- HMS Jaseur (1813) was a Cruizer-class brig-sloop launched in 1813 and sold in 1847.
- HMS Jaseur (1857) was a wood screw gunboat launched in 1857 and wrecked in 1859.
- HMS Jaseur (1862) was a Philomel-class wood screw gunvessel launched in 1862 and sold in 1874 to the Commissioners of Irish Lights. Whether they renamed her and how long they kept her is unclear.
- HMS Jaseur (1892) was a torpedo gunboat launched in 1892 and sold in 1905.
- HMS Jaseur (1944) was an Algerine-class minesweeper launched in 1944 and sold for breaking up in 1956.
