= William Henry Ward =

William Henry Ward was an American inventor. He was, on April 30, 1872, granted a US patent for "Improvement for collecting electricity for telegraphing" (US 126356). He theorized that an "electrical layer in the atmosphere" could carry signals like a telegraph wire, and thus is sometimes listed among supposed inventors of radio.

== See also ==
- Mahlon Loomis
