= Clementina Trenholme =

Canadian author and social organiser

Clementina Trenholme (Fessenden)
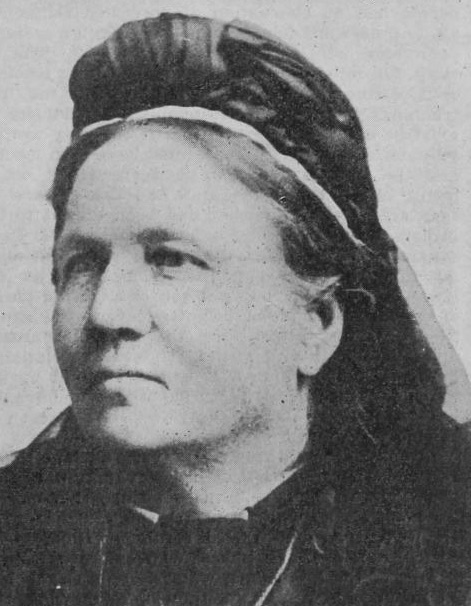
- Born: May 4, 1843; Kingsey Township, Lower Canada
- Died: September 14, 1918 (aged 75); Hamilton, Ontario, Canada
- Monuments: Fessenden Public School (Ancaster, Ontario, named 1959), Fessenden and Trenholme neighbourhoods (Hamilton, Ontario), Plaque at St John's Anglican Church (1929), Monument at grave: "Clementina Fessenden, Founder of Empire Day"
- Occupations: Imperialist, writer, anti-suffrage activist
- Known for: Founding Empire Day in Canada, opposition to Women's suffrage, anti-American activism
- Spouse: Elisha Joseph Fessenden (m. 1865; d. 1896)
- Children: 4 (including Reginald Aubrey Fessenden)

Clementina Trenholme (Fessenden) (4 May 1843 – 14 September 1918) was a Canadian imperialist, writer, and anti-suffrage activist. She is best known for founding Empire Day in Canada and for her outspoken opposition to women's suffrage and American influence. She has a son, Reginald Aubrey Fessenden, who has contributed to radio and sonar technology.

== Early life and education ==
Born in Kingsey Township, Lower Canada, Trenholme was the daughter of English and Irish immigrants. She was the fourth of twelve children in a household deeply committed to British loyalism. Educated locally and later at Miss Loy’s Seminary in Montreal, she married Anglican priest Elisha Joseph Fessenden in 1865. The couple lived in East Bolton, Fergus, and Chippawa, where Trenholme raised their children and became involved in church publications.

== Activism ==
=== Imperial activism ===
Following her husband’s death in 1896, Trenholme dedicated herself to imperialist causes. In 1897, she launched a campaign to establish Empire Day in Canadian schools, linking patriotism with education. Her proposal gained support from Ontario’s Minister of Education, George William Ross, and Empire Day was first observed in 1898. She published Our Union Jack (1898) to promote British heritage and pushed for the preservation of British symbolism, including the Red Ensign.

She was a founding member of the Imperial Order Daughters of the Empire (IODE) in Hamilton, serving as secretary of the Fessenden Chapter. She spoke at public events, addressed royalty, and advocated for military and historical commemorations, including funding colours for the 13th Regiment and preserving Dundurn Castle as a museum.

=== Symbolic campaigns and public agitation ===
Trenholme campaigned aggressively against American symbols in Canada and protested proposed monuments to American generals Richard Montgomery and George Washington. She lobbied for patriotic education materials and helped fund a monument at the Battle of Stoney Creek site. In 1910, she published The Genesis of Empire Day, asserting her role as its originator and seeking recognition and a government annuity.

=== Opposition to women's suffrage ===
Fessenden was a strong opponent of women’s suffrage in early 20th-century Canada. She believed giving women the vote was meaningless because men still held power to enforce laws. She argued that political rights would not translate into real influence for women. She voiced her views in a series of newspaper letters, including one in the Hamilton Spectator in 1913. In that letter, she called suffragism “the thin edge of the wedge,” claiming it would open the door to socialism, agnosticism, anarchy, and feminism. She warned that these ideas would lead to the “dismemberment of the Empire.” Fessenden accepted some aspects of the women’s movement, but only when they focused on strengthening women’s roles in the home and community. She opposed any move that shifted women toward formal politics or public office. Her activism reflected a broader view held by some elite Canadian women at the time. They saw suffrage not as progress, but as a threat to social stability, religion, and loyalty to the British Empire.

== Later life, death and honors ==
=== World War I and death ===
During World War I, Trenholme supported the Belgian Relief Committee and circulated a petition opposing the Women’s Peace Party’s anti-war stance, demanding total victory over Germany. She died in Hamilton in 1918, two months before the armistice. After her death, the IODE held annual Empire Day memorials at her gravesite. She was buried in St John's Anglican cemetery, Ancaster, Ontario. Fessenden is commemorated with a tablet in St. John's Church, Ancaster, Ontario, where her husband, the Rev. F. J. Fessenden, served as rector for many years. The tablet, erected by the IODE, bears the inscription: "In Memory of Clementina Fessenden, Founder of Empire Day 1897. Erected by the Imperial Order Daughters of the Empire.".

An elementary school in Ancaster, Fessenden Public School, was named in her honour and opened in 1959. Two neighbourhoods were also named after her, Fessenden and Trenholme, both on Hamilton Mountain.
