= Reginald Fessenden =

Canadian-American electrical engineer and inventor (1866–1932)

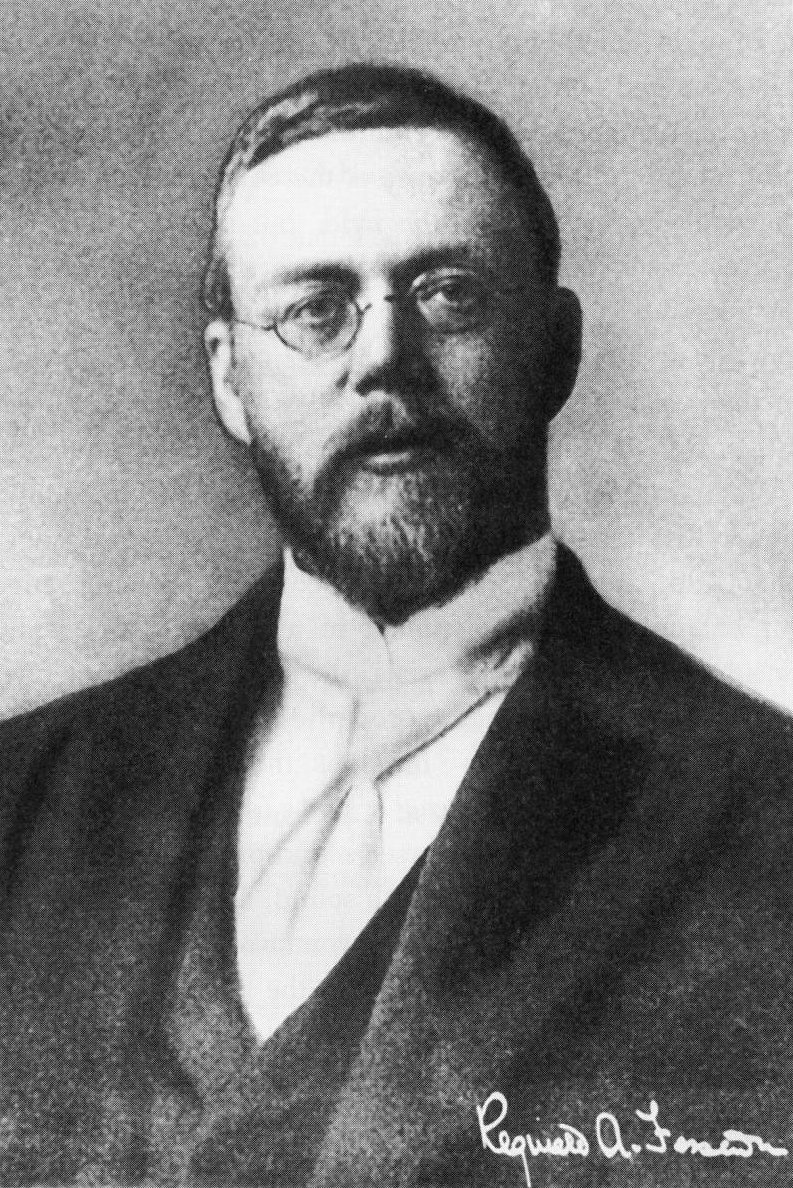
- Fessenden in 1903
- Born: Reginald Aubrey Fessenden; October 6, 1866; East Bolton, Canada East, Province of Canada, British North America
- Died: July 22, 1932 (aged 65); Bermuda
- Citizenship: Canada; United States
- Education: Trinity College School; Bishop's College School; University of Bishop's College
- Known for: Inventing amplitude modulation (1900); Inventing the beat frequency oscillator (1901); Inventing the hot-wire barretter (1902); Patenting a heterodyne (1905); Fessenden oscillator (1912)
- Spouse: Helen May Trott (m. 1890)
- Children: 1
- Mother: Clementina Trenholme
- Awards: IRE Medal of Honor (1921); John Scott Medal (1922)
- Engineering career
- Discipline: Electrical engineering
- Institutions: Purdue University (1892–1893); University of Pittsburgh (1893–1900)
- Employers: Edison Machine Works (1886); West Orange Laboratory (1886–1890); U.S. Weather Bureau (1900–1902)

Reginald Aubrey Fessenden (October 6, 1866 – July 22, 1932) was a Canadian-American electrical engineer and inventor who received hundreds of patents in fields related to radio and sonar between 1891 and 1936 (seven of them after his death).

Fessenden pioneered developments in radio technology, including the foundations of amplitude modulation (AM) radio. His achievements included the first transmission of speech by radio (1900), and the first two-way radiotelegraphic communication across the Atlantic Ocean (1906). In 1932 he claimed that, in late 1906, he had also made the first radio broadcast of entertainment and music, although that claim has not been well documented.

He did a majority of his work in the United States and, in addition to his Canadian citizenship, claimed U.S. citizenship through his American-born father.

== Early years ==
Reginald Fessenden was born on October 6, 1866, in East Bolton, Canada East, the eldest of four children of the Reverend Elisha Joseph Fessenden and Clementina Trenholme. Elisha Fessenden was a Church of England in Canada minister, and the family moved to a number of postings throughout the province of Ontario.

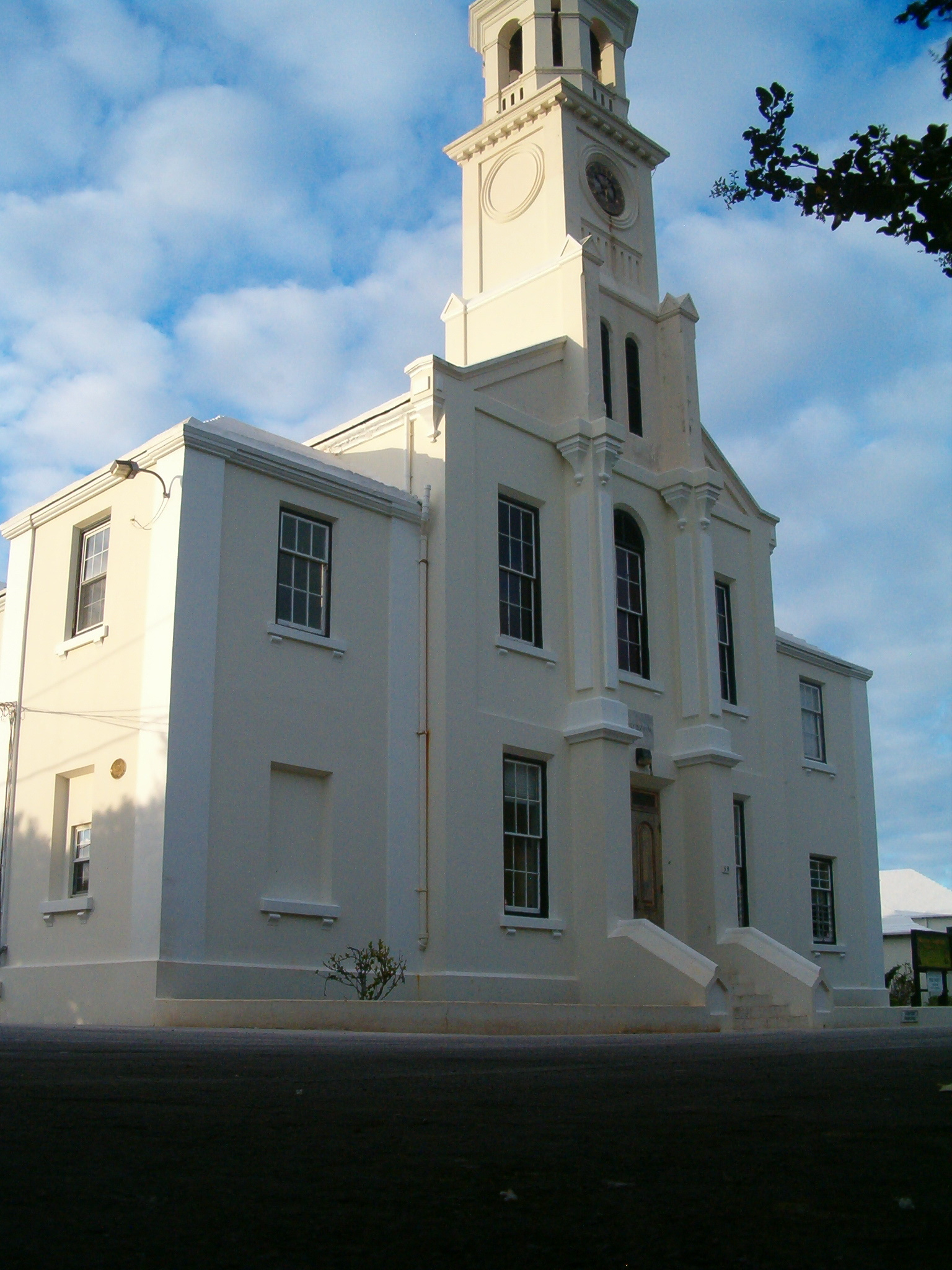
Whitney Institute in Bermuda, founded in 1881, of which Fessenden was headmaster

Fessenden attended a number of educational institutions. At the young age of nine he was enrolled in the DeVeaux Military school for a year. He next attended Trinity College School in Port Hope, Ontario, from 1877 until the summer of 1879. He also spent a year working for the Imperial Bank at Woodstock because he had not yet reached the age of 16 needed to enroll in college.

At the age of fourteen, he returned to his hometown in the Eastern Townships and went to the nearby Bishop's College School, which granted him a mathematics mastership (teaching job) and a scholarship for studying in its college division at University of Bishop's College. Thus, while Fessenden was still a teenager, he taught mathematics to the school's younger students (some older than himself) for four years, while simultaneously studying natural sciences with older students at the college.

At the age of eighteen, Fessenden left Bishop's without having been awarded a degree, although he had "done substantially all the work necessary", in order to accept a position at the Whitney Institute, near to Flatts Village in Bermuda, where for the next two years he worked as the headmaster and sole teacher. (This lack of a degree may have hurt Fessenden's employment opportunities. When McGill University in Montreal established an electrical engineering department, his application to become its chairman was turned down.) While in Bermuda, he became engaged to Helen May Trott of Smith's Parish. They married on September 21, 1890, in the United States at Manhattan in New York City, and later had a son, Reginald Kennelly Fessenden, born May 7, 1893, in Lafayette, Allen, Indiana.

Reginald Fessenden commemorative plaque, located at Austin, Quebec, Canada

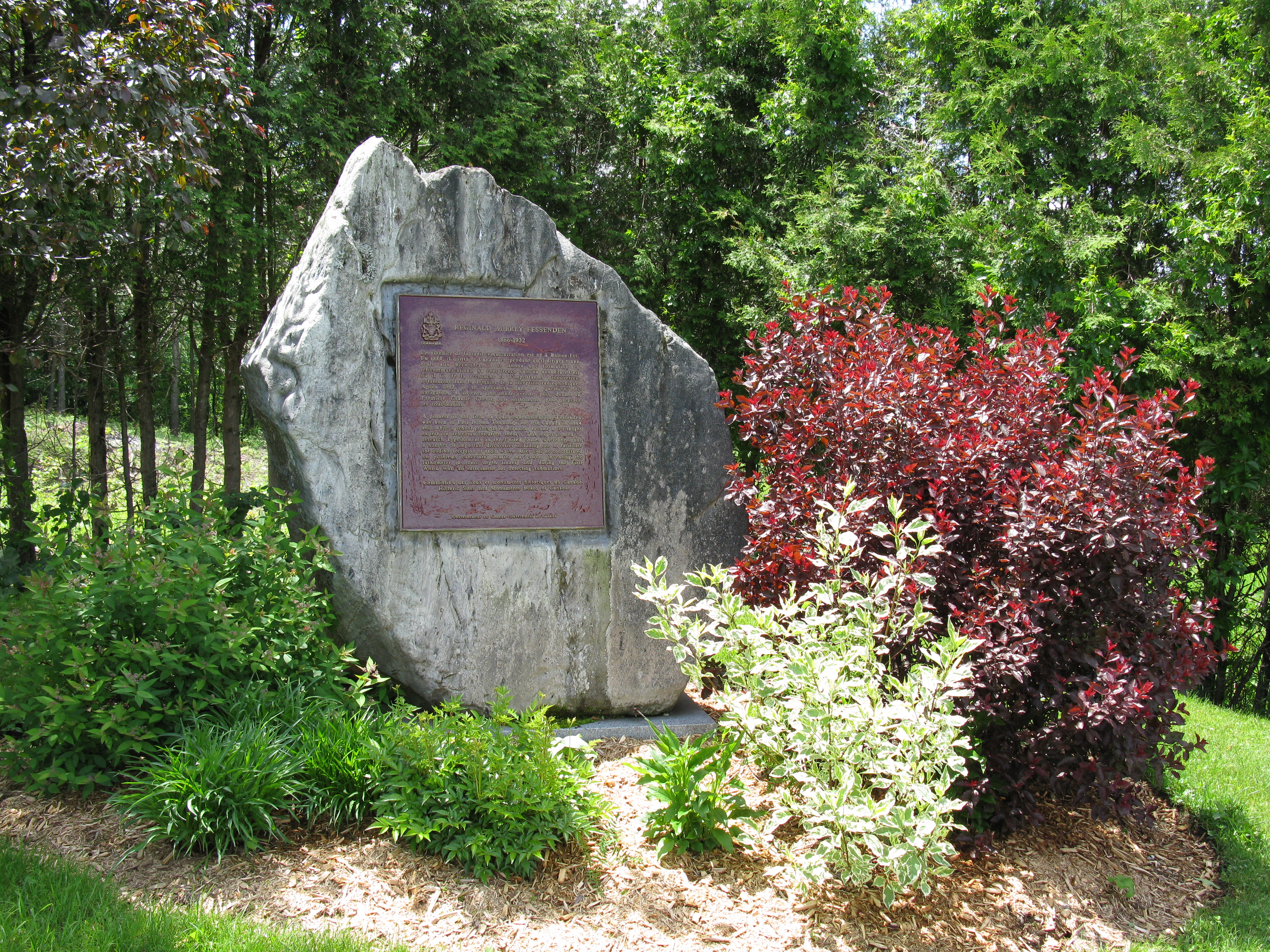
Located near Fessenden's birthplace, this plaque was installed by the Historic Sites and Monuments Board of Canada

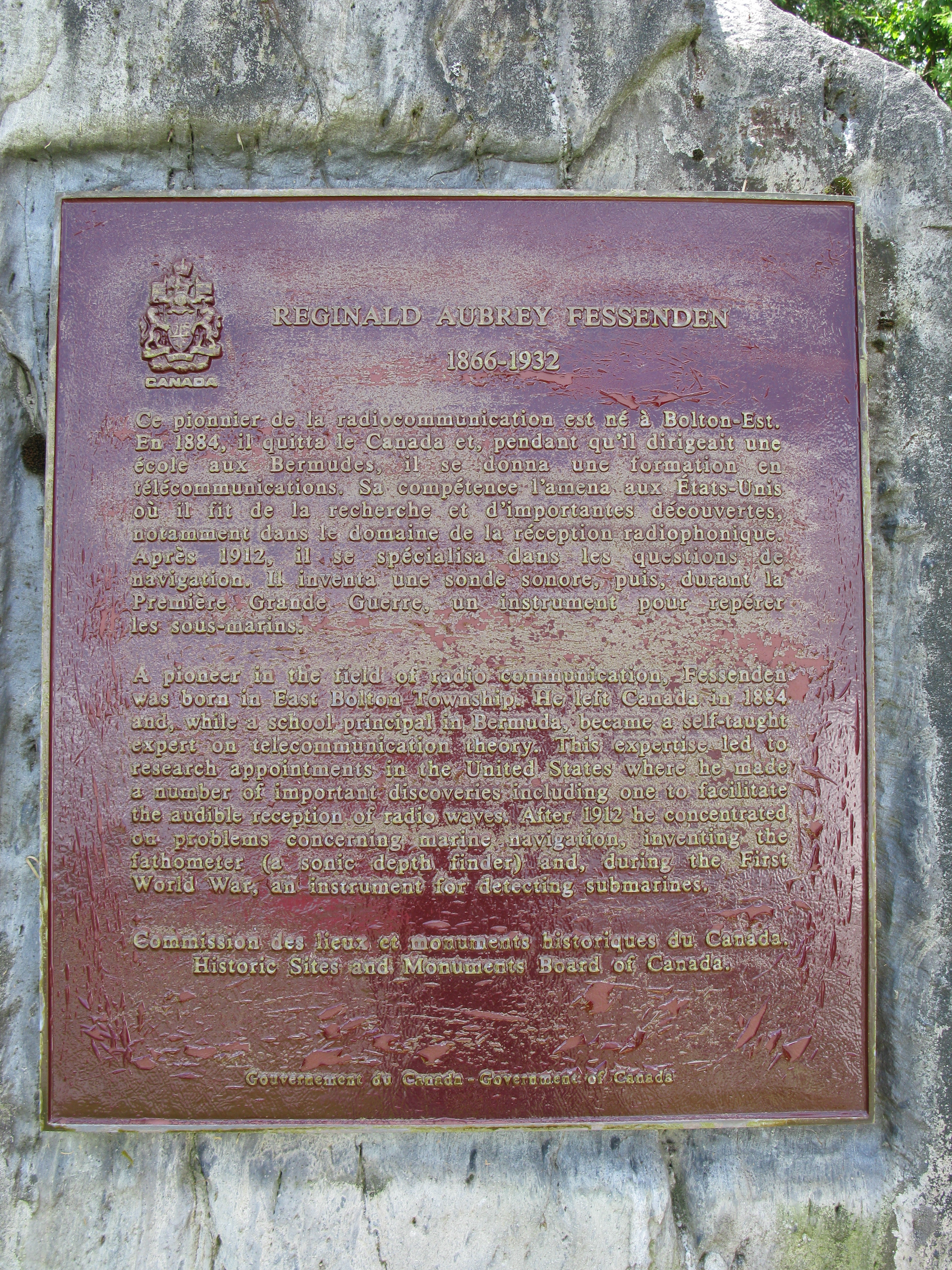
It reviews his telecommunications and submarine detection work

== Early work ==
Fessenden's classical education provided him with only a limited amount of scientific and technical training. Interested in increasing his skills in the electrical field, he moved to New York City in 1886, with hopes of gaining employment with the famous inventor, Thomas Edison. However, his initial attempts were rebuffed; in his first application Fessenden wrote, "Do not know anything about electricity, but can learn pretty quick," to which Edison replied, "Have enough men now who do not know about electricity." However, Fessenden persevered, and before the end of the year was hired for a semi-skilled position as an assistant tester for the Edison Machine Works, which was laying underground electrical mains in New York City. He quickly proved his worth, and received a series of promotions, with increasing responsibility for the project. In late 1886, Fessenden began working directly for Edison at the inventor's new laboratory in West Orange, New Jersey, as a junior technician. He participated in a broad range of projects, which included work in solving problems in chemistry, metallurgy, and electricity. However, in 1890, facing financial problems, Edison was forced to lay off most of the laboratory employees, including Fessenden. (Fessenden remained an admirer of Edison his entire life, and in 1925 stated that "there is only one figure in history which stands in the same rank as him as an inventor, i. e. Archimedes".)

Taking advantage of his recent practical experience, Fessenden was able to find positions with a series of manufacturing companies. In 1892, he received an appointment as professor for the newly formed Electrical Engineering department at Purdue University in West Lafayette, Indiana; while there, he helped the Westinghouse Corporation install the lighting for the 1893 Chicago World Columbian Exposition. Later that year, George Westinghouse personally recruited Fessenden for the newly created position of chair of the Electrical Engineering department at the Western University of Pennsylvania in Pittsburgh (now the University of Pittsburgh).

== Radio work ==
In the late 1890s, reports began to appear about the success Guglielmo Marconi was having in developing a practical system of transmitting and receiving radio signals, then commonly known as "wireless telegraphy". Fessenden began limited radio experimentation, and soon came to the conclusion that he could develop a far more efficient system than the spark-gap transmitter and coherer-receiver combination which had been created by Oliver Lodge and Marconi. By 1899 he was able to send radiotelegraph messages between Pittsburgh and Allegheny City (now an area of Pittsburgh), using a receiver of his own design.

=== Weather Bureau contract ===
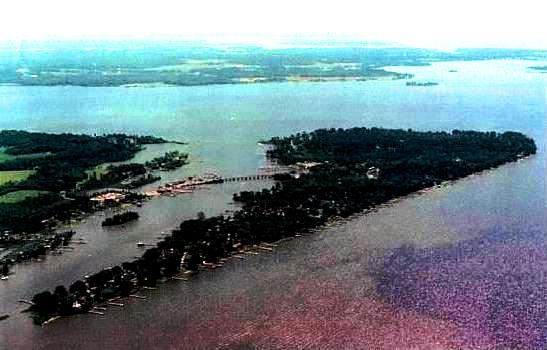
Cobb Island on the Potomac River, scene of the first successful radio transmission of speech in the fall of 1900.

In 1900 Fessenden left Pittsburgh to work for the United States Weather Bureau, with the objective of demonstrating the practicality of using coastal stations to transmit weather information, thereby avoiding the expense of the existing telegraph lines. The contract called for him to be paid $3,000 per year and provided with work space, assistance, and housing. Fessenden would retain ownership of any inventions, but the agreement also gave the Weather Bureau royalty-free use of any discoveries made during the term of the contract. Fessenden quickly made major advances, especially in receiver design, as he worked to develop audio reception of signals. His initial success came from the invention of a barretter detector. This was followed by an electrolytic detector, consisting of a fine wire dipped in nitric acid, which for the next few years set the standard for sensitivity in radio reception.

As his work progressed, Fessenden also developed the heterodyne principle, which used two closely spaced radio signals to produce an audible tone that made Morse code transmissions much easier to hear. However, heterodyne reception would not become practical for a decade after it was invented, because it required a method for producing a stable local signal, which would not become available until the development of the oscillating vacuum-tube.

Fessenden's initial Weather Bureau work took place at Cobb Island, Maryland, located in the Potomac River about 80 kilometers (50 mi) downstream from Washington, D.C. As the experimentation expanded, additional stations were built along the Atlantic Coast in North Carolina and Virginia. However, in the midst of promising advances, Fessenden became embroiled in disputes with his sponsor. In particular, he charged that Bureau Chief Willis Moore had attempted to gain a half-share of the patents. Fessenden refused to sign over the rights, and his work for the Weather Bureau ended in August 1902.

=== National Electric Signaling Company ===
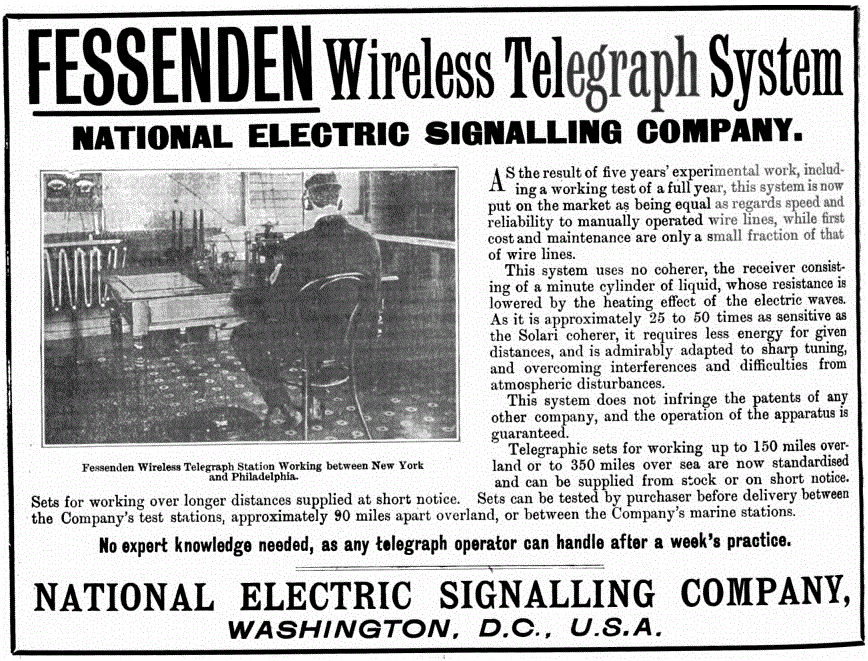
April 1904 company advertisement

In November 1902, two wealthy Pittsburgh businessmen, Hay Walker Jr. and Thomas H. Given, financed the formation of the National Electric Signaling Company (NESCO) to support Fessenden's research. Initially the new company was based in Washington, D.C., where a station was constructed for experimental and demonstration purposes. Two additional demonstration stations were constructed at Collingswood, New Jersey (near Philadelphia) and Jersey City, New Jersey (near New York City). In 1904 an attempt was made to link the General Electric plants in Schenectady, New York, and Lynn, Massachusetts, a distance of 185 miles (298 km); however, the effort was unsuccessful.

Efforts to sell equipment to the U.S. and other governments, as well as private companies, met with little success. An ongoing area of conflict, especially with the U.S. Navy, were the high prices Fessenden tried to charge. The Navy in particular felt Fessenden's quotes were too far above the device's manufacturing costs to be considered reasonable, and contracted with other companies to build equipment that used Fessenden designs. This led to bad feelings and a series of patent infringement lawsuits. An alternate plan to sell the company as a whole was unsuccessful in finding a buyer. Eventually, a radical change in company orientation took place. In 1904 it was decided to compete with the existing ocean cables, by setting up a transatlantic radiotelegraph link. The headquarters for company operations was moved to Brant Rock, Massachusetts, which was to be the western terminal for the proposed new service.

=== Rotary-spark transmitter and the first two-way transatlantic transmission ===
The plan was to conduct the transatlantic service using Fessenden-designed rotary spark-gap transmitters. A 420-foot (128 meter) guyed antenna was constructed at Brant Rock, with a similar tower erected at Machrihanish in western Scotland. In January 1906, these stations made the first successful two-way transmission across the Atlantic, exchanging Morse code messages. (Marconi had only achieved one-way transmissions at this time.) However, the system was unable to reliably bridge this distance when the sun was up, or during the summer months when interference levels were higher, so work was suspended until later in the year. Then, on December 6, 1906, the Machrihanish radio tower collapsed in a gale, abruptly ending the transatlantic project before it could begin commercial service. (A detailed review in Engineering magazine blamed the collapse on sub-standard construction, due to "the way in which the joints were made by the man employed for the purpose by the sub-contractors to whom the work was entrusted by the Brown Hoisting Machinery Company" and "The only wonder is that the tower did not fall before.")

In a letter published in the Scientific American issue dated January 1, 1907, Fessenden discounted the effect of the tower collapse, stating that "The working up to the date of the accident was, however, so successful that the directors of the National Electric Signaling Company have decided that it is unnecessary to carry on the experimental developments any further, and specifications are being drawn up for the erection of five stations for doing transatlantic and other cable work, and a commercial permit is being applied for in England." However, the tower collapse did in fact mark the end of NESCO's transatlantic efforts.

Brant Rock, Massachusetts, facility

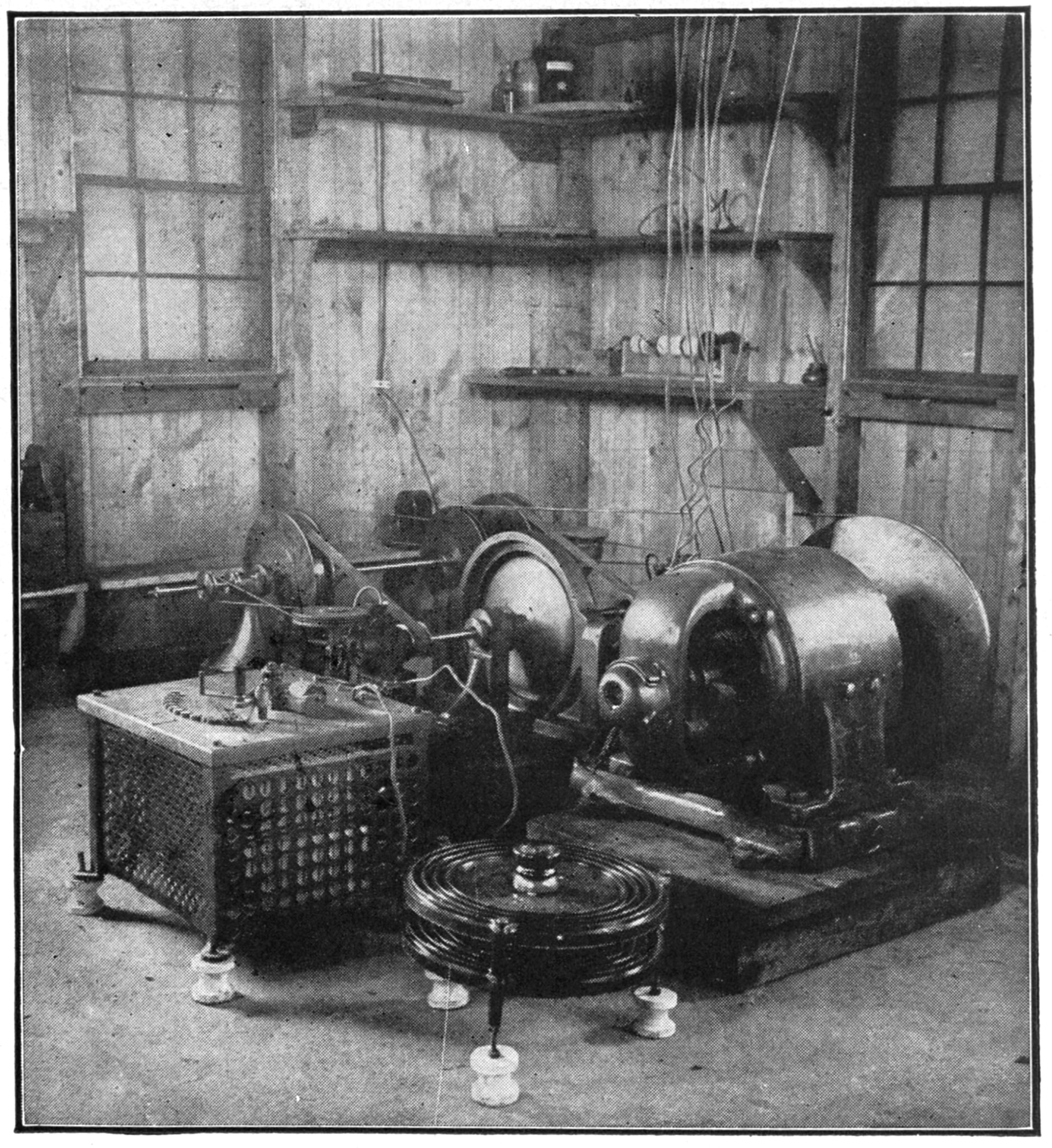
Alternator transmitter, used for audio transmissions (1906)

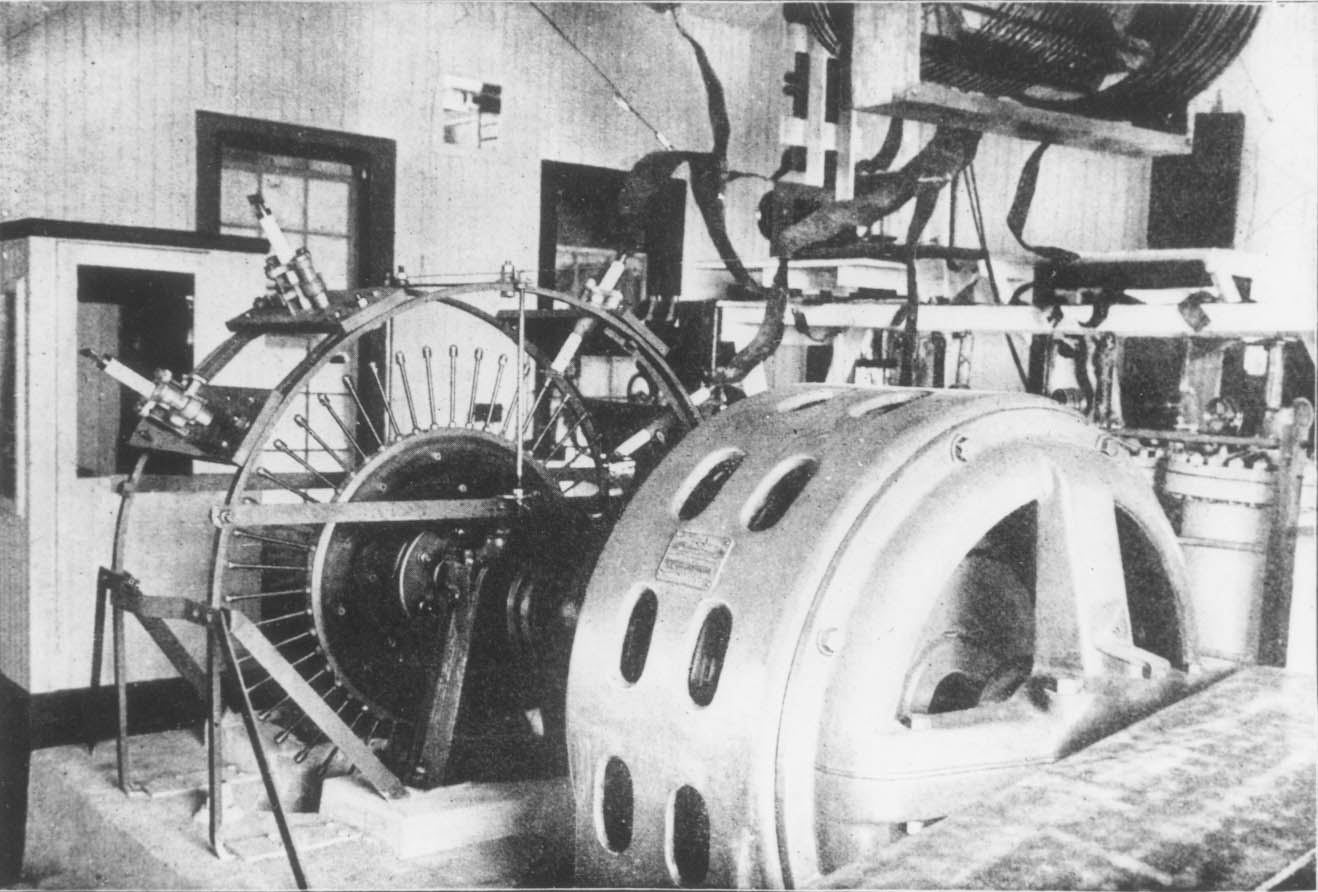
Rotary spark-gap transmitter (c.1906), used for radiotelegraph communication

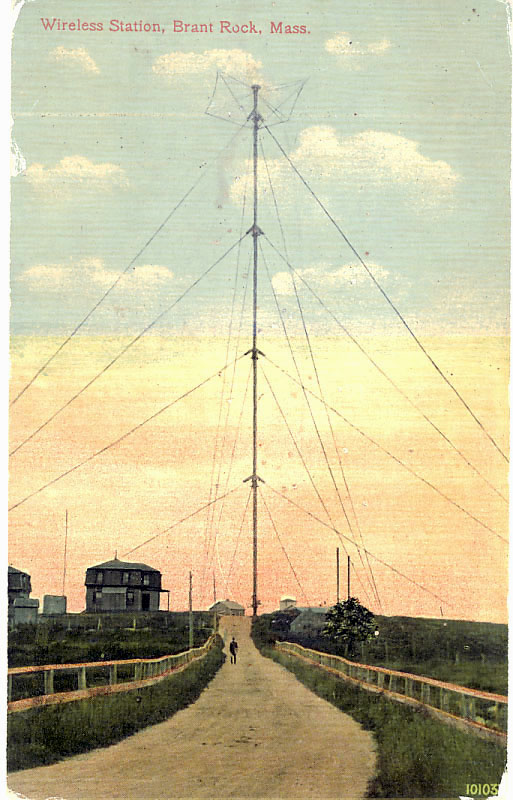
Postcard (c. 1910) of the 420-foot- (128-meter-) tall Brant Rock radio tower

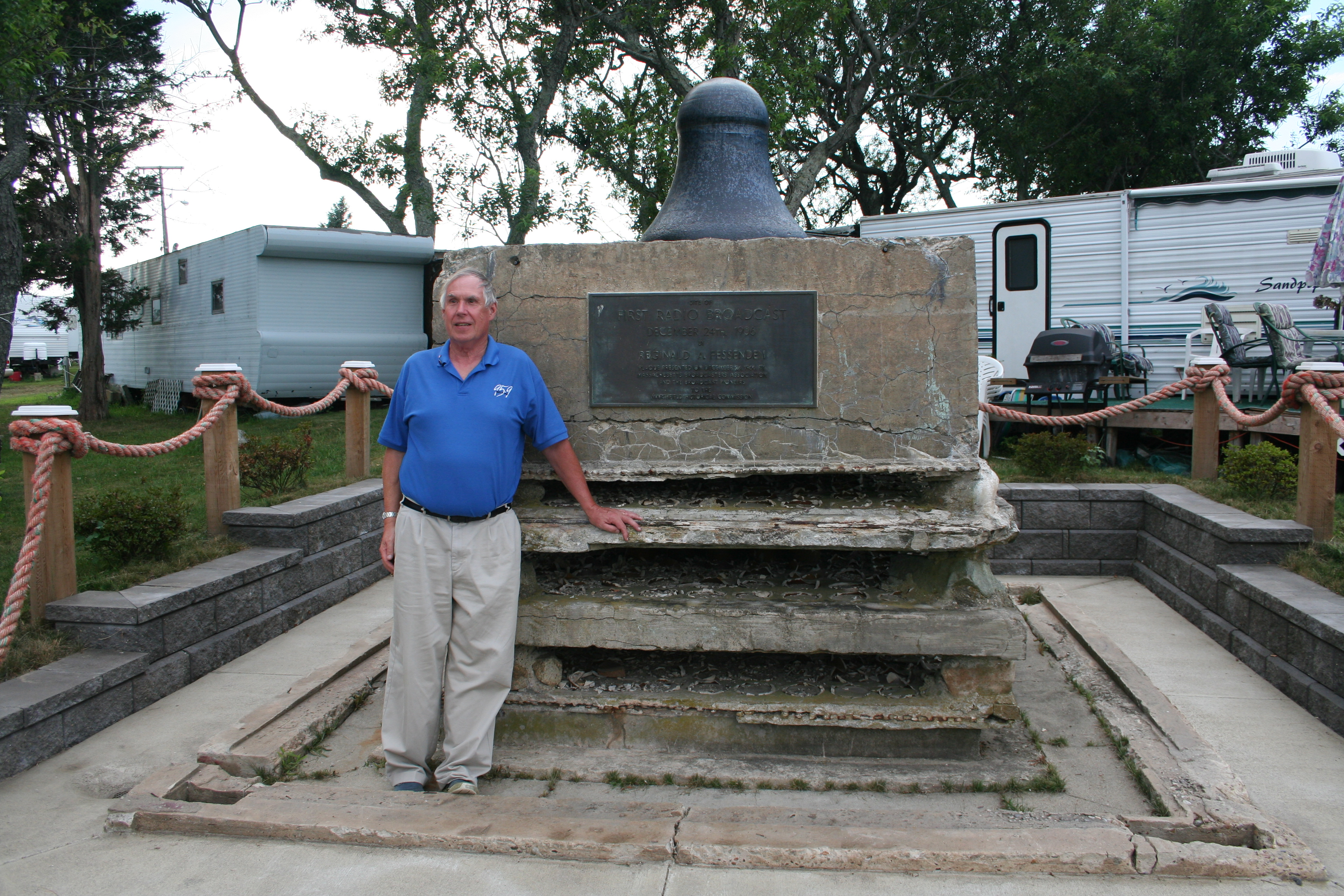
Although the tower was demolished in 1917, the insulated base on which it stood survives. The layers of concrete were originally separated by ceramic insulators.

=== Audio transmissions ===
Fessenden had a very early interest in the possibility of making audio radio transmissions, in contrast to the early spark-gap transmissions that could only transmit Morse code messages. As early as 1891, he had investigated sending alternating currents of varying frequencies along telegraph lines, in order to create a multiplex telegraph system. He would later apply the knowledge gained about tuning and resonance from his alternating current electrical work to the higher frequency currents used in radio, in order to develop the concept of continuous-wave radio signals.

Fessenden's basic approach was disclosed in U.S. patent 706,737, which he applied for on May 29, 1901, and was issued the next year. It called for the use of a high-speed alternator (referred to as "an alternating-current dynamo") that generated "pure sine waves" and produced "a continuous train of radiant waves of substantially uniform strength", or, in modern terminology, a continuous-wave (CW) transmitter. The idea of using continuous-wave radio signals was in direct conflict with the current orthodoxy that the abrupt "whiplash" effect produced by large electrical sparks was needed in order to create adequately strong signals. John Ambrose Fleming, a Marconi associate, was particularly dismissive in his book The Principles of Electric Wave Telegraphy, a detailed review of the state of the art as he saw it that was published in 1906. Reviewing Fessenden's patent, he wrote that "The creation of an electric wave seems to involve a certain suddenness in the beginning of the oscillations, and an alternator giving a simple sine-curve would not be likely to produce the required effect..." (In view of Fessenden's ultimate success, this statement disappeared from the book's 1916 edition.) Fessenden's next step, taken from standard wire-telephone practice, was to insert a simple carbon microphone into the transmission line, which was used to modulate the carrier wave signal for audio transmissions, or, again using modern terms, used to produce amplitude modulated (AM) radio signals.

Fessenden began his research on audio transmissions while still on Cobb Island. Because he did not yet have a continuous-wave transmitter, initially he worked with an experimental "high-frequency spark" transmitter, taking advantage of the fact that the higher the spark rate, the closer a spark-gap transmission comes to producing continuous waves. He later reported that, on December 23, 1900, he successfully transmitted speech over a distance of about 1.6 kilometers (one mile), saying; “One, two, three, four. Is It snowing where you are, Mr. Thiessen? If so, telegraph back and let me know”, which appears to have been the first successful audio transmission using radio signals. However, at this time the sound was far too distorted to be commercially practical, although as a test this did show that with further refinements it would become possible to effectively transmit sounds by radio.

For a time Fessenden continued working with more sophisticated high-frequency spark transmitters, including versions that used compressed air, which began to take on some of the characteristics of arc-transmitters patented by Valdemar Poulsen. Fessenden unsuccessfully attempted to sell this form of radiotelephone, later noting: "In 1904, with a 20,000 frequency spark and compressed nitrogen gap, such good results were obtained that a demonstration was given to a number of electrical engineers, who signed affidavits that they considered the articulation as commercially good over twenty-five miles, and the sets were advertised for sale..." (In a 1908 review, he conceded that with this approach "The transmission was, however, still not absolutely perfect.")

=== Alternator-transmitter ===
Fessenden's ultimate plan for an audio-capable transmitter was to take a basic electrical alternator, which normally rotated at speeds that produced alternating current of at most a few hundred cycles-per-second (Hz), and greatly increase its rotational speed, in order to create electrical currents of tens-of-thousands of cycles-per-second (kHz), thus producing a steady continuous-wave transmission when connected to an aerial. However, it would take many years of expensive development before even a prototype alternator-transmitter would be ready, and a few years beyond that for high-power versions to become available. One concern was whether at these high speeds the alternator might disintegrate due to the high rotation speed tearing it apart. Because of this, as a precaution, while the alternator was being initially developed it was "placed in a pit surrounded by sandbags".

Fessenden contracted with General Electric (GE) to help design and produce a series of high-frequency alternator-transmitters. In 1903, Charles Proteus Steinmetz of GE delivered a 10 kHz version which proved of limited use and could not be directly used as a radio transmitter. Fessenden's request for a faster, more powerful unit was assigned to Ernst F. W. Alexanderson, who in August 1906 delivered an improved model which operated at a transmitting frequency of approximately 50 kHz, although with far less power than Fessenden's rotary-spark transmitters.

The alternator-transmitter achieved the goal of transmitting quality audio signals, but the lack of any way to amplify the signals meant they were somewhat weak. On December 21, 1906, Fessenden made an extensive demonstration of the new alternator-transmitter at Brant Rock, showing its utility for point-to-point wireless telephony, including interconnecting his stations to the wire telephone network. As part of the demonstration, speech was transmitted 18 kilometers (11 miles) to a listening site at Plymouth, Massachusetts. A detailed review of this demonstration appeared in The American Telephone Journal and a summary by Fessenden appeared in Scientific American. A portion of a report produced by Greenleaf W. Pickard of the Telephone Company's Boston office, which includes additional information on some still existing defects, appeared in Ernst Ruhmer's Wireless Telephony in Theory and Practice.

Although primarily designed for transmissions spanning a few kilometers, on a couple of occasions the test Brant Rock audio transmissions were apparently overheard by NESCO employee James C. Armor across the Atlantic at the Machrihanish site.

=== First entertainment radio broadcast ===
Until the early 1930s, it was generally accepted that Lee de Forest, who conducted a series of test broadcasts beginning in 1907, and who was widely quoted promoting the potential of organized radio broadcasting, was the first person to transmit music and entertainment by radio. De Forest's first entertainment broadcast occurred in February 1907, when he transmitted electronic telharmonium music from his laboratory station in New York City. This was followed by tests that included, in the fall, Eugenia Farrar singing "I Love You Truly". (Beginning in 1904, the U.S. Navy had broadcast daily time signals and weather reports, but these employed spark transmitters, transmitting in Morse code).

In 1928, as part of a lecture reviewing "The Early History of Radio in the United States", H. P. Davis, commenting on entertainment offerings, asserted that "Reginald Fessenden, probably the first to attempt this, broadcast a program Christmas Eve 1906", but did not provide any additional details, and his comment was little noticed at the time.

The first widely publicized information about Fessenden's early broadcasts did not appear until 1932, when an article prepared by former Fessenden associate Samuel M. Kintner, "Pittsburgh's Contributions to Radio", appeared in the December 1932 issue of The Proceedings of the Institute of Radio Engineers. This reviewed information included in a letter sent by Fessenden to Kintner dated January 29, 1932. (Fessenden subsequently died five months before Kintner's article appeared). In this account, Fessenden reported that on the evening of December 24, 1906 (Christmas Eve), he had made the first of two radio broadcasts of music and entertainment to a general audience, using the alternator-transmitter at Brant Rock. Fessenden remembered producing a short program that included a phonograph record of Ombra mai fu (Largo) by George Frideric Handel, followed by Fessenden playing Adolphe Adam's carol O Holy Night on the violin and singing Adore and be Still by Gounod, and closing with a biblical passage: "Glory to God in the highest and on earth peace to men of good will" (Luke 2:14). He also stated that a second short program was broadcast on December 31 (New Year's Eve). The intended audience for both of these transmissions was primarily shipboard radio operators along the Atlantic seaboard. Fessenden claimed that the two programs had been widely publicized in advance, and the Christmas Eve broadcast had been heard "as far down" as Norfolk, Virginia, while the New Year Eve's broadcast had reached listeners in the West Indies.

Anticipation of the 2006 centennial anniversary of Fessenden's reported broadcasts brought renewed interest, as well as additional questions. A key issue was why, despite Fessenden's assertion that the two programs had been widely heard, there did not appear to be any independent corroborating evidence for his account. (Even the Helen Fessenden biography relies exclusively on details contained in the letter reported by the Kintner article.) There was general consensus in the centennial discussions that Fessenden had the technical means to make broadcasts, given the widespread reports about the success of the December 21 alternator-transmitter demonstrations. However, because of the station's very low power, even if the broadcasts had taken place it was questionable if the range could have matched Fessenden's claim of being heard hundreds of kilometers away.

In the period leading up to the centennial, James E. O'Neal conducted extensive research, but did not find any ships' radio log accounts, or any contemporary literature, to confirm the reported holiday broadcasts. A follow-up article two years later further reported that a similar attempt to verify the details of the broadcasts had taken place in 1956, which had also failed to uncover any confirmation of Fessenden's statements. One alternate possibility proposed by O'Neal was that perhaps something similar to what Fessenden remembered could have taken place during a series of tests conducted in 1909. A review by Donna L. Halper and Christopher H. Sterling suggested that debating the existence of the holiday broadcasts was ignoring the fact that, in their opinion, the December 21 demonstration, which included the playing of a phonograph record, in itself qualified to be considered an entertainment broadcast. Jack Belrose flatly argued that there was no reason to doubt Fessenden's account, in part because it had not been challenged in the years immediately following publication of the Kintner article. Although Fessenden's claim for the first radio broadcast in 1906 is recognized as an IEEE Milestone, in view of the contrasting opinions among radio historians, Mike Adams summarized the situation as "More than 100 years after its possible occurrence, the Fessenden 'first broadcaster' controversy continues."

The American Telephone Journal account of the December 21 alternator-transmitter demonstration included the statement that "It is admirably adapted to the transmission of news, music, etc. as, owing to the fact that no wires are needed, simultaneous transmission to many subscribers can be effected as easily as to a few", echoing the words of a handout distributed to the demonstration witnesses, which stated "[Radio] Telephony is admirably adapted for transmitting news, stock quotations, music, race reports, etc. simultaneously over a city, on account of the fact that no wires are needed and a single apparatus can distribute to ten thousand subscribers as easily as to a few. It is proposed to erect stations for this purpose in the large cities here and abroad." However, other than the two reported holiday transmissions, Fessenden does not appear to have conducted any other radio broadcasts, or to have even given additional thought about the potential of a regular broadcast service. In a 1908 comprehensive review of "Wireless Telephony", he included a section titled "possibilities" that listed promising radio telephone uses. Neither the main article, nor this list, makes any reference to broadcasting, instead only noting conventional applications of point-to-point communication, enumerated as "local exchanges", "long-distance lines", "transmarine transmission", "wireless telephony from ship to ship", and "wireless telephone from ship to local exchange".

=== Continuing work and dismissal from NESCO ===
The technical achievements made by Fessenden were not matched by financial success. Walker and Given continued to hope to sell NESCO to a larger company such as the American Telephone & Telegraph Company (AT&T). After the demonstrations on December 21, 1906, AT&T was said to be planning to acquire NESCO, but financial setbacks caused the telephone company to reconsider, and NESCO was unable to find another buyer. There were growing strains between Fessenden and the company owners, and Fessenden's formation of the Fessenden Wireless Company of Canada in Montreal in 1906 may have led to suspicion that he was trying to freeze Walker and Given out of a potentially lucrative competing transatlantic service. The final break occurred in January 1911, when Fessenden was formally dismissed from NESCO. This resulted in his bringing suit against NESCO, for breach of contract. Fessenden won the initial court trial and was awarded damages; however, NESCO prevailed on appeal. To conserve assets, NESCO went into receivership in 1912, and Samuel Kintner was appointed general manager of the company. The legal stalemate would continue for over 15 years. In 1917, NESCO finally emerged from receivership, and was soon renamed the International Radio Telegraph Company. The company limped along for a few years, until it was sold to the Westinghouse Electric & Manufacturing Company in 1920, and the next year its assets, including numerous important Fessenden patents, were sold to the Radio Corporation of America (RCA), which also inherited the longstanding Fessenden legal proceedings. Finally, on March 31, 1928, Fessenden settled his outstanding lawsuits with RCA, receiving a significant cash settlement.

== Later years ==
After Fessenden left NESCO, Ernst Alexanderson continued to work on alternator-transmitter development at General Electric, mostly for long range radiotelegraph use. He eventually developed the high-powered Alexanderson alternator, capable of transmitting across the Atlantic, and by 1916 the Fessenden-Alexanderson alternator was more reliable for transoceanic communication than the spark transmitters which were originally used to provide this service. Also, after 1920 radio broadcasting became widespread, and although the stations used vacuum-tube transmitters rather than alternator-transmitters (which vacuum-tubes made obsolete), they employed the same continuous-wave AM signals that Fessenden had introduced in 1906.

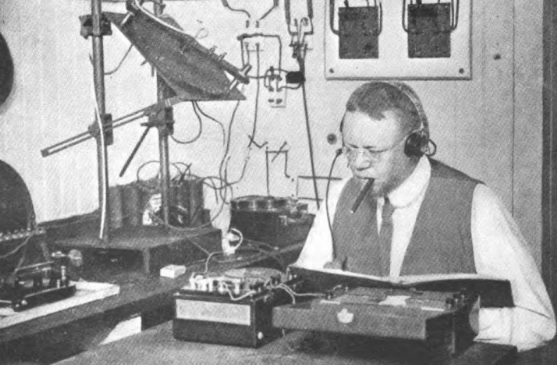
Fessenden operating underwater oscillator in 1915.

Although Fessenden ceased radio research after his dismissal from NESCO in 1911, he continued to work in other fields. As early as 1904 he had helped engineer the Niagara Falls power plant for the newly formed Hydro-Electric Power Commission of Ontario. However, his most extensive work was in marine communication as consulting engineer with the Submarine Signal Company which built a widely used aid to navigation using bells, termed a submarine signal, acting much as an underwater foghorn. While there, he invented the Fessenden oscillator, an electromechanical transducer. Though the company immediately began replacing bells and primitive receivers on ships with the new device, it was also the basis for entirely new applications: underwater telegraphy and sonic distance measurement. The later was the basis for sonar (SOund NAvigation Ranging), echo-sounding and the principle applied to radar (RAdio Detection And Ranging). The device was soon put to use for submarines to signal each other, as well as a method for locating icebergs, to help avoid another disaster like the one that sank Titanic. While the company quickly applied his invention to replace the bells of its systems and entered acoustic telegraphy it ignored the echo ranging potential. The echo sounding was invented in 1912 by German physicist Alexander Behm.

At the outbreak of World War I, Fessenden volunteered his services to the Canadian government and was sent to London where he developed a device to detect enemy artillery and another to locate enemy submarines. Other efforts included a version of microfilm, that helped him to keep a compact record of his inventions, projects and patents. He also patented the basic ideas leading to reflection seismology, a technique important for its use in exploring for petroleum, and received patents for diverse subjects that included tracer bullets, paging, television apparatus, and a turbo electric drive for ships.

An inveterate tinkerer, Fessenden eventually became the holder of more than 500 patents. He could often be found in a river or lake, floating on his back, a cigar sticking out of his mouth and a hat pulled down over his eyes. At home he liked to lie on the carpet, a cat on his chest. In this state of relaxation, Fessenden could imagine, invent and think his way to new ideas. Fessenden also had a reputation for being temperamental, although in his defense his wife later stated that "Fessenden was never a difficult man to W O R K with but he was an intensely difficult man to play politics with." However, one of his former assistants, Charles J. Pannill, recalled that "He was a great character, of splendid physique, but what a temper!", while a second, Roy Weagant, ruefully noted that "He could be very nice at times, but only at times."

In 1925, Radio News, saluting Fessenden as "one of the greatest American radio inventors", began a monthly autobiographical series titled "The Inventions of Reginald A. Fessenden", with the intention of publishing the completed installments as a book. However, instead of reviewing his radio work, Fessenden immediately went on a series of tangents, including discussions of which races he believed were the most capable of producing inventions, and the proper approach that government institutions should be taking in order to support inventors. (At the close of the seventh installment, Radio News included a disclaimer that it was "not responsible for any opinions expressed in Dr. Fessenden's article".) After eleven installments Fessenden had only covered his life up to 1893, having discussed virtually nothing about radio, and the series was quietly terminated at this point.

== Awards ==
In 1921, the Institute of Radio Engineers presented Fessenden with its IRE Medal of Honor. The medallion was gold plated, and somehow Fessenden became convinced that earlier awards had been solid gold, so he angrily returned it. Only after Greenleaf W. Pickard investigated the matter and determined that the prior medals were also plated was Fessenden willing to relent. The next year Philadelphia's Board of Directors of City Trusts awarded Fessenden a John Scott Medal, which included a cash prize of $800, for "his invention of a reception scheme for continuous wave telegraphy and telephony", and recognized him as "One whose labors had been of great benefit." There was suspicion by Fessenden that these two awards had not been made in sincerity but in order to placate him. In his wife's biography, referring to the IRE medal, she quoted the proverb "beware of Greeks bearing gifts". The Scott Medal came under additional suspicion because it had been awarded at the suggestion of Westinghouse engineers, who were working for a company that had had financial disputes with Fessenden. In Helen Fessenden's opinion, "The Medal cost [Westinghouse] nothing and was a good 'sop to Cereberus'", and overall compared the medals to "small change for tips in the pockets of Big Business". In 1929 Fessenden was awarded Scientific American's Safety at Sea Gold Medal, in recognition of his invention "of the Fathometer and other safety instruments for safety at sea".

== Death and legacy ==
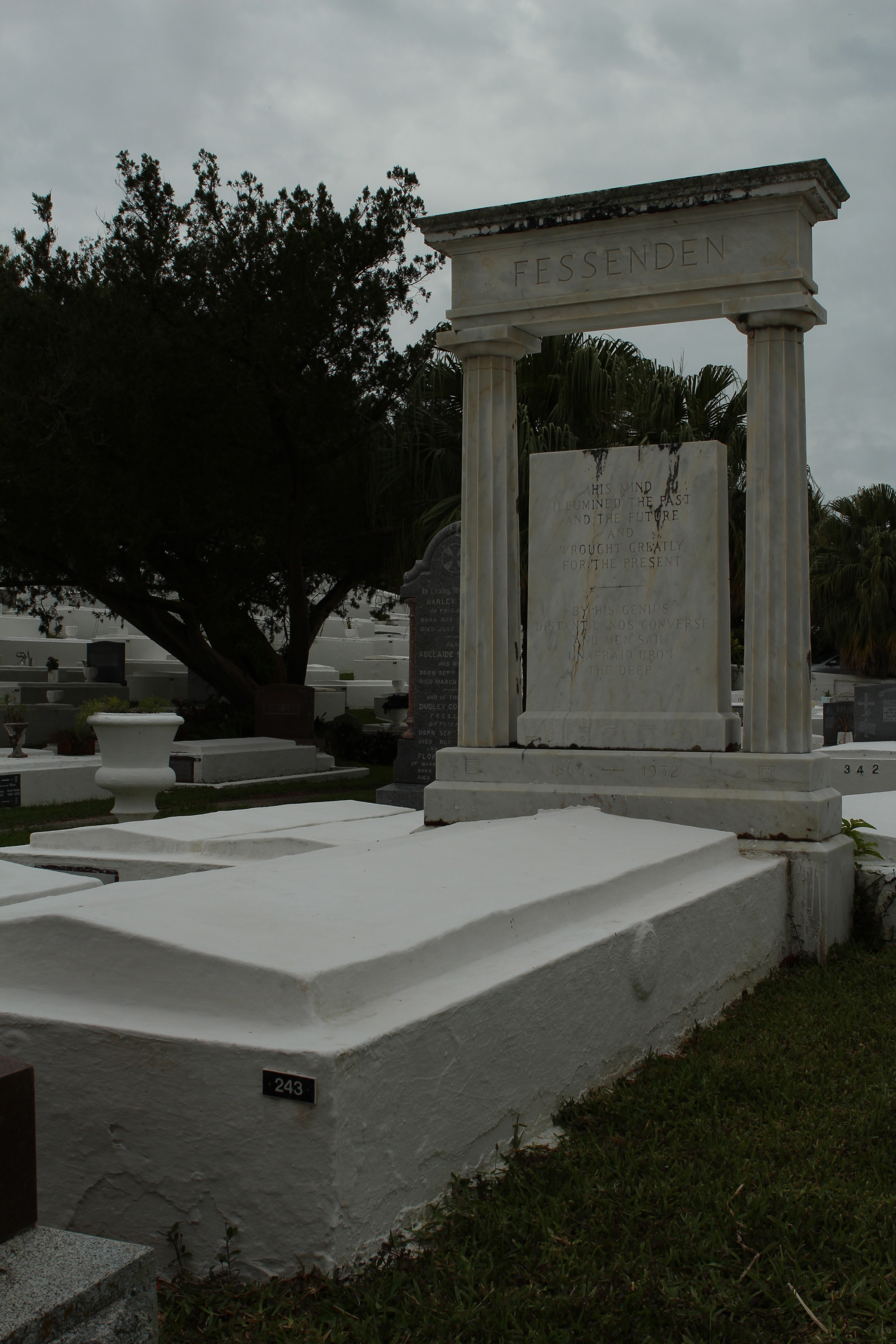
Gravesite in St. Mark's church cemetery in Bermuda

After settling his lawsuit with RCA, Fessenden purchased a small estate called "Wistowe" (previously the home of Charles Maxwell Allen, the United States Consul, who had hosted Samuel Clemens there), in Hamilton Parish, near to Flatts Village in Bermuda. He died there on July 22, 1932, and was interred in the cemetery of St. Mark's Church, Bermuda. On the occasion of his death, an editorial in the New York Herald Tribune, "Fessenden Against the World", said:

It sometimes happens, even in science, that one man can be right against the world. Professor Fessenden was that man. It is ironic that among the hundreds of thousands of young radio engineers whose commonplaces of theory rest on what Professor Fessenden fought for bitterly and alone only a handful realize that the battle ever happened... It was he who insisted, against the stormy protests of every recognized authority, that what we now call radio was worked by "continuous waves" of the kind discovered by Hertz, sent through the ether by the transmitting station as light waves are sent out by a flame. Marconi and others insisted, instead, that what was happening was the so-called "whiplash effect"... It is probably not too much to say that the progress of radio was retarded a decade by this error... The whiplash theory faded gradually out of men's minds and was replaced by the continuous wave one with all too little credit to the man who had been right...

Beginning in 1961, the Society of Exploration Geophysicists has annually awarded its Reginald Fessenden Award to "a person who has made a specific technical contribution to exploration geophysics". In 1980, a Fessenden-Trott Scholarship was established at Purdue University's School of Electrical and Computer Engineering, in memory of Reginald Fessenden and his wife.

=== Reginald A. Fessenden House ===
Fessenden's home at 45 Waban Hill Road in the village of Chestnut Hill in Newton, Massachusetts, is on the National Register of Historic Places and is also a U.S. National Historic Landmark. He bought the house in 1906 or earlier and owned it for the rest of his life.

== See also ==
- Alexanderson alternator: used by Fessenden for his first radio broadcast.
- Fessenden oscillator
- List of Bishop's College School alumni
- Reginald Fessenden patents
- Sonar
