= Reginald A. Fessenden House =

Historic house in Massachusetts, United States

- U.S. National Register of Historic Places
- U.S. National Historic Landmark
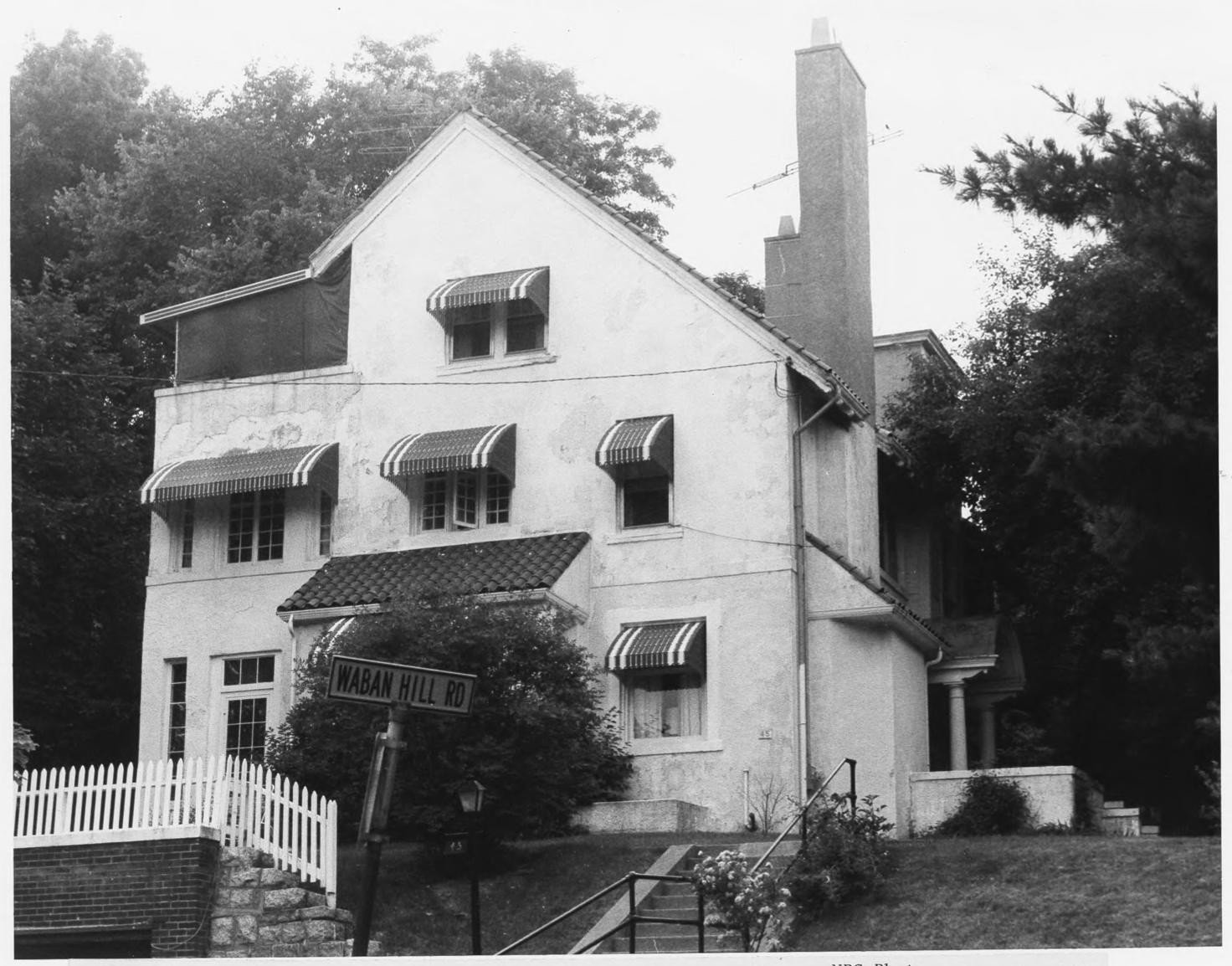
- Reginald A. Fessenden House in 1975
- Location: 45 Waban Hill Road, Chestnut Hill, Newton, Massachusetts
- Coordinates: 42°20′25″N 71°10′16″W
- Area: less than one acre
- Built: 1919
- NRHP reference No.: 76000950

Significant dates
- Added to NRHP: January 7, 1976
- Designated NHL: January 7, 1976

The Reginald A. Fessenden House is a historic house in the village of Chestnut Hill in Newton, Massachusetts. It was the residence from 1919 to his death in 1932 of the inventor Reginald A. Fessenden (1866–1932), called "the father of radio broadcasting," because he was the first to broadcast the human voice and music by radio. The house was designated a National Historic Landmark in 1976 in recognition of Fessenden's accomplishments.

== Description and history ==
The Fessenden House is an architecturally undistinguished three story brick building, with a stuccoed exterior and a tile roof. It has vernacular styling that includes a hooded entry, large central chimney, and a generally asymmetrical massing. The interior follows a fairly typical central hall plan. Both the exterior and interior of the house are relatively unaltered since Fessenden's ownership; the only notable alteration is the addition of awnings on some of the east-facing windows.

Reginald A. Fessenden was born in Quebec in 1866, and entered Bishop's University as a precocious young mathematical prodigy, but left in 1884 without graduating. In 1886, he took a position at the Edison Machine Works, working for inventor Thomas Edison. During an academic period teaching at Purdue University and at the University of Pittsburgh, Fessenden engaged in research on the nascent subject of wireless telegraphy. Much of the rest of his life he was employed in industry, either directly or as a consultant, but was often living near poverty, and produced a stream of inventions. In 1904 he invented the rotary spark-gap transmitter, and in 1906 he built a large transmitter in Massachusetts from which he successfully made a voice transmission. He also discovered the means to recombine separate frequencies to form a coherent audible sound. At his death he was described by inventor and businessman Elihu Thomson as "the greatest wireless inventor of the age, greater than Marconi."

Fessenden purchased the Newton house in 1919, and it was his home until his death in 1932. Although he spent most of later years in Bermuda, this house is the place with the longest-lasting association with his life in the United States. It is still a private home and is not open to the public.

The house was declared a National Historic Landmark on January 7, 1976, and was listed on the National Register of Historic Places, in recognition that it is one of the few places with a long-term association with Fessenden.

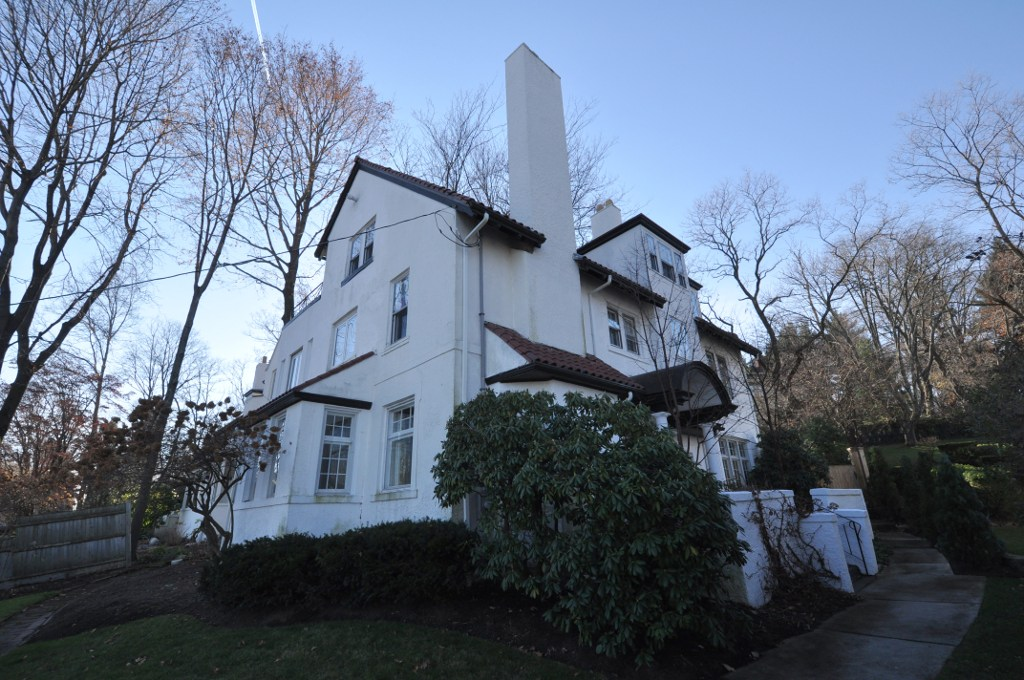
The house in 2012

== See also ==
- National Register of Historic Places listings in Newton, Massachusetts
- List of National Historic Landmarks in Massachusetts
