= Commonwealth Day =

Annual celebration in the Commonwealth of Nations

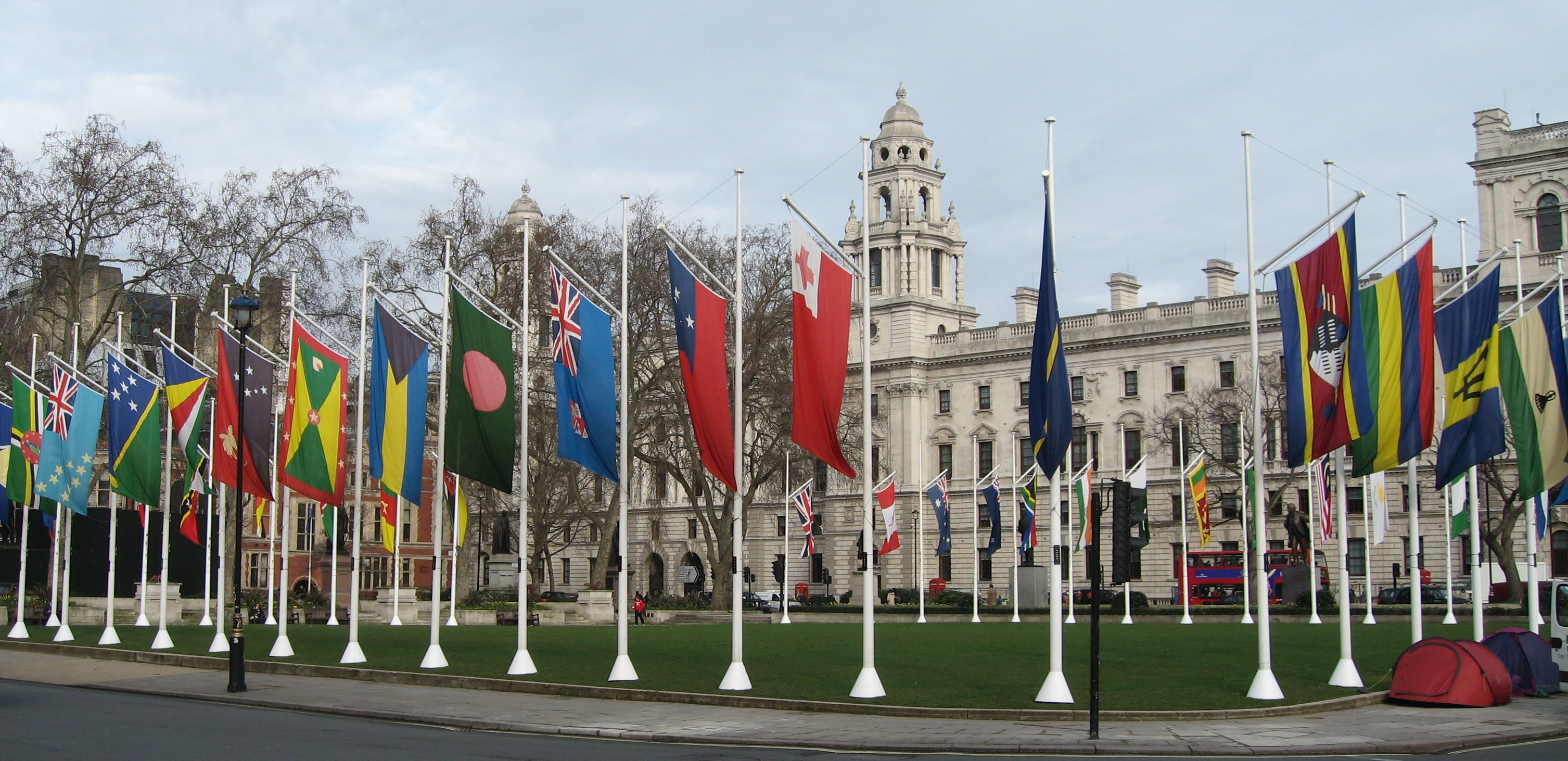
- Flags of member states of the Commonwealth of Nations flying at Parliament Square in London on Commonwealth Day, 2009
- Observed by: Commonwealth of Nations
- Date: Second Monday in March
- 2025 date: March 10
- 2026 date: March 9
- 2027 date: March 8
- 2028 date: March 13
- Frequency: Annual
- Related to: Victoria Day/Sovereign's Day (Note: Empire Day/Commonwealth Day was formerly held on 24 May, coinciding with Queen Victoria's birthdate, or the weekday that preceded it. In 1977, Commonwealth Day was moved to the second Monday in March, ending its association with Queen Victoria's birthdate. In Belize, Commonwealth Day/Sovereign's Day continued to be observed in May until 2021.)

Commonwealth Day is the annual celebration of the Commonwealth of Nations, held on the second Monday in March. While the date holds some official status in select member states of the Commonwealth, observances of the date are not uniform, and the date is not celebrated as a public holiday in most Commonwealth countries. (Note: Tuvalu observes Commonwealth Day as a public holiday. Belize, and select British Overseas Territories, including Gibraltar, also formerly observed Commonwealth Day as a public holiday.)

The event traces its origins to Empire Day, an event initially conceived to celebrate the British Empire. It was originally observed on Queen Victoria's birthday (24 May) or the last weekday before it. In the latter half of the 20th century, the celebration's focus shifted towards emphasising the modern Commonwealth of Nations, and the event was renamed Commonwealth Day in 1958; its date was moved to the second Monday in March in 1977.

Commonwealth Day is typically marked by a Commonwealth Day message made by the Head of the Commonwealth, as well as additional statements from the Commonwealth Secretary-General. Inter-denominational observances are also held in cities across the Commonwealth, including one led by the Head of the Commonwealth at Westminster Abbey in London and attended by the Commonwealth Secretary-General.

Flag-raising ceremonies for the flag of the Commonwealth of Nations are also held in Commonwealth countries. The flags of Commonwealth member states are flown at select locations in the United Kingdom, whilst the Royal Union Flag is flown at federal installations in Canada.

== History ==
The idea of observing one day each year as a public holiday throughout the British Empire was first suggested in 1894 and 1895 by Thomas Robinson, the honorary secretary for the Royal Colonial Institute based in Winnipeg. Taking up Robinson's suggestion, the Royal Colonial Institute's London council petitioned Queen Victoria in July 1894, arguing that while other nations had annual national celebrations, the British Empire lacked one. They proposed designating the Queen's birthday for this purpose. In a reply the British prime minister, Archibald Primrose, 5th Earl of Rosebery, stated that it was a matter not for the government but for the community and pointed out that government departments already observed the Queen's birthday as a holiday. However, the idea quickly gained support from organisations such as the British Empire League in the 1890s.

School guide for observances of Empire Day in the schools of Ontario from 1929.

The idea to hold an "Empire Day" as a day that would "remind children that they formed part of the British Empire" also gained support among educations during the 1890s. Championed by Clementina Trenholme, Empire Day was first observed in Ontario schools in 1898 and scheduled for the last school day before May 24, Queen Victoria's birthday. After Victoria's death in 1902, the colonies of British South Africa continued to observe her birthdate as Empire Day. Empire Day was introduced in the United Kingdom in 1904 by Reginald Brabazon, 12th Earl of Meath, "to nurture a sense of collective identity and imperial responsibility among young empire citizens".

After the death of Queen Victoria on 22 January 1901, her birthday, 24 May, was celebrated from 1902 as Empire Day, though not officially recognised as an annual event until 1916. In schools, morning lessons were devoted to "exercises calculated to remind (the children) of their mighty heritage". The centrepiece of the day was an organised and ritualistic veneration of the Union flag. Schoolchildren were given the afternoon off, and further events were usually held in their local community.

After the First World War, the jingoism was toned down in favour of sombre commemoration in the festival. In 1925, 90,000 people attended an Empire Day thanksgiving service held at Wembley Stadium as part of the British Empire Exhibition. However, Empire Day became more of a sombre commemoration in the aftermath of the First World War, and politically partisan in the United Kingdom as the Labour Party passed a resolution in 1926 to prevent the further celebration of Empire Day.

The Conservative party and other groups adopted Empire Day as a vehicle for anti-socialist propaganda, whilst the communist party exploited it as an opportunity to attack British imperialism. Other protests came from local Labour groups and pacifist dissenters. The overt politicization of Empire Day severely disrupted its hegemonic function and the political battles fought over the form and purpose of the celebrations made it difficult to uphold the notion that the festival was merely a benign tribute to a legitimate and natural state of affairs.

Along with official condemnation from the Labour Party, left-wing youth organisations such as the Young Communist League and the Woodcraft Folk organised protests against Empire Day celebrations in schools from 1927 through to the early 1930s.

=== Change in name and date ===
After the Second World War the event fell into rapid decline. On 18 December 1958 the British prime minister, Harold Macmillan, announced in the House of Commons that Empire Day would be renamed Commonwealth Day.

In 1973 the National Council in Canada of the Royal Commonwealth Society submitted a proposal to the Canadian prime minister, Pierre Elliot Trudeau, that Commonwealth Day should be observed simultaneously throughout the Commonwealth of Nations. The proposal was included in the Canadian items for inclusion in the agenda for the 1975 Commonwealth Heads of Government Meeting. After the meeting, it was agreed that the Commonwealth Secretariat would select a date with no historical connotations so that the entire Commonwealth could use it as a date to celebrate Commonwealth Day. At a meeting in Canberra in May 1976, senior Commonwealth officials agreed on a new fixed date for Commonwealth Day, the second Monday in March. The second Monday of March was selected by Commonwealth leaders as it was a day when most schools would be in session, facilitating student participation in several Commonwealth-related activities, including mini-Commonwealth Games, simulated Commonwealth Heads of Government Meeting, and studies and celebrations on the geography, ecology, products or societies of other Commonwealth countries.

== Observance ==
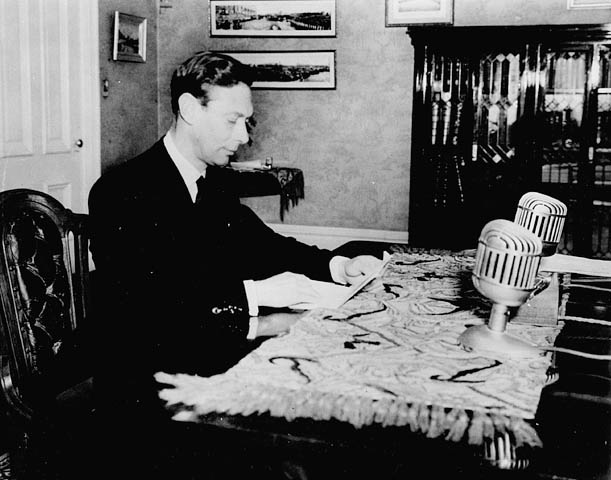
King George VI gives his Empire Day address in Winnipeg, 1939.

Commonwealth Day is held on the second Monday in March. However, there is not a uniform observance of the day worldwide.

On the day, the Head of the Commonwealth broadcasts a message throughout the entire Commonwealth of Nations. The broadcast is addressed to the people of the Commonwealth, and not to specific governments. Past Commonwealth Day messages by Queen Elizabeth II are themed after an issue of importance to the Commonwealth which she thinks people can have an impact on. In some member states of the Commonwealth, the message is sometimes augmented by an address from a member country's president, prime minister, or another senior minister. The Commonwealth Secretary-General also issues a statement on the day, which is read on the radio or published in some Commonwealth countries.

Several cities throughout the Commonwealth host multi-cultural and inter-denominational services to mark the day. Flag-raising ceremonies for the flag of the Commonwealth of Nations are also held in several Commonwealth countries.

=== United Kingdom ===
On Commonwealth Day, flags of the member states of the Commonwealth of Nations are flown in Parliament Square and at Marlborough House. The flag of the United Kingdom is flown from UK public buildings on the second Monday in March to mark Commonwealth Day. Flag flying guidelines for the Scottish Government and its related agencies also advises the flying of the flags of the Commonwealth of Nations and Scotland on the date, only if the building has two or more flagpoles.

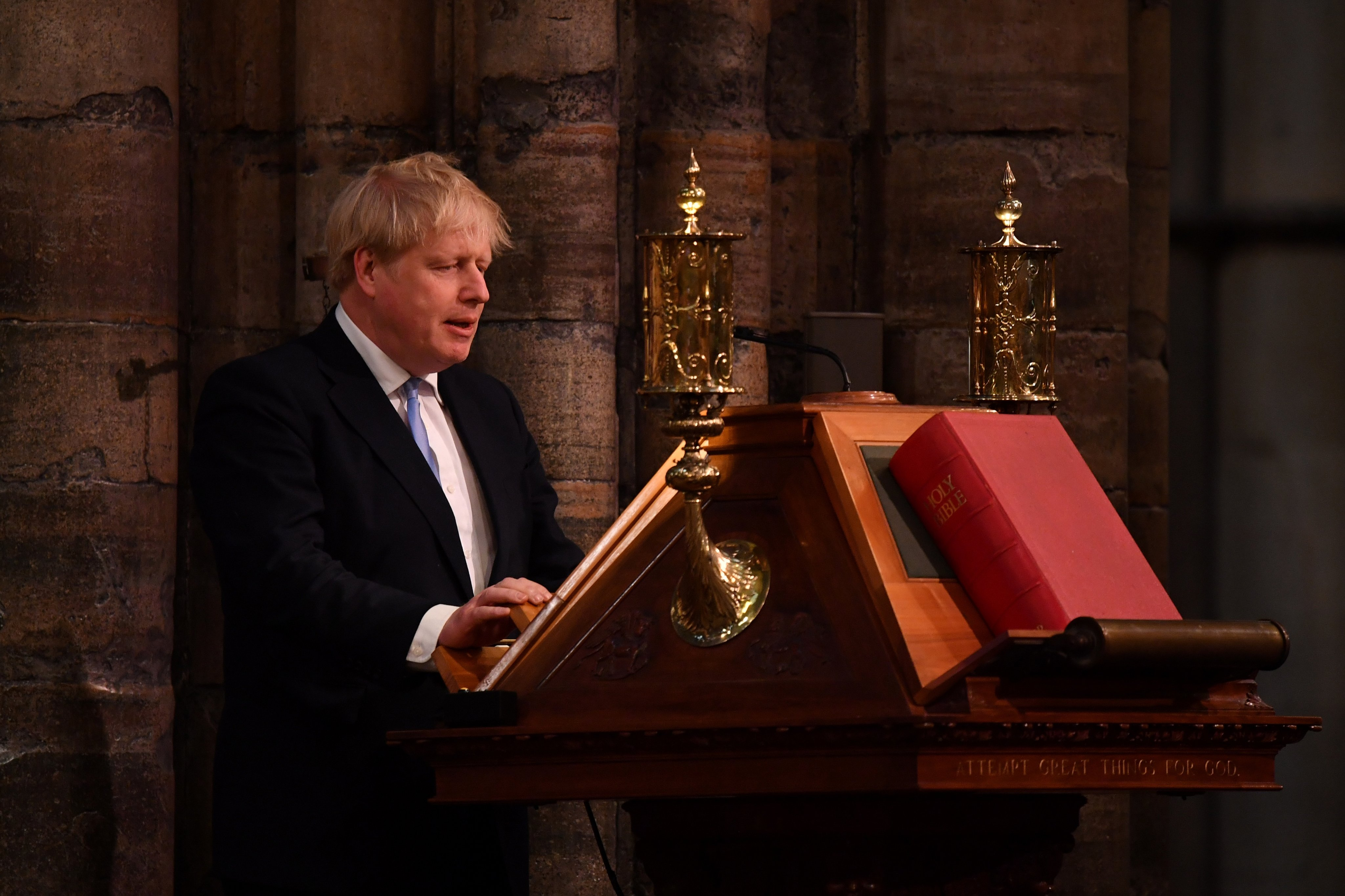
British Prime Minister Boris Johnson speaking at Westminster Abbey on Commonwealth Day 2020

In London an inter-denominational service is led by the Head of the Commonwealth at Westminster Abbey. During the service, representatives of Commonwealth countries offer the flags of member states for blessing. A reception hosted by the Commonwealth Secretary-General is held after the service. A wreath-laying ceremony to commemorate the sacrifice of Commonwealth soldiers at London's Commonwealth Memorial Gates is attended by the Commonwealth Secretary-General, and is held before the service at Westminster Abbey.

Several other events, such as the Commonwealth Africa Summit, also take place around the United Kingdom on Commonwealth Day.

==== British Overseas Territories ====
Commonwealth Day was formerly celebrated as a public holiday in several British Overseas Territories. The day was observed as a school holiday in British Hong Kong before the Sovereignty transfer from the United Kingdom to China in 1997. The date was also formerly observed as a public holiday in Gibraltar. In 2021 the holiday was moved to February instead of March. In 2022, Commonwealth Day was no longer listed as a public holiday in Gibraltar, with the February public holiday replaced by the Winter Midterm Bank Holiday. Although the event is no longer a public holiday, the Government of Gibraltar continues to mark Commonwealth Day through various events.

=== Australia ===
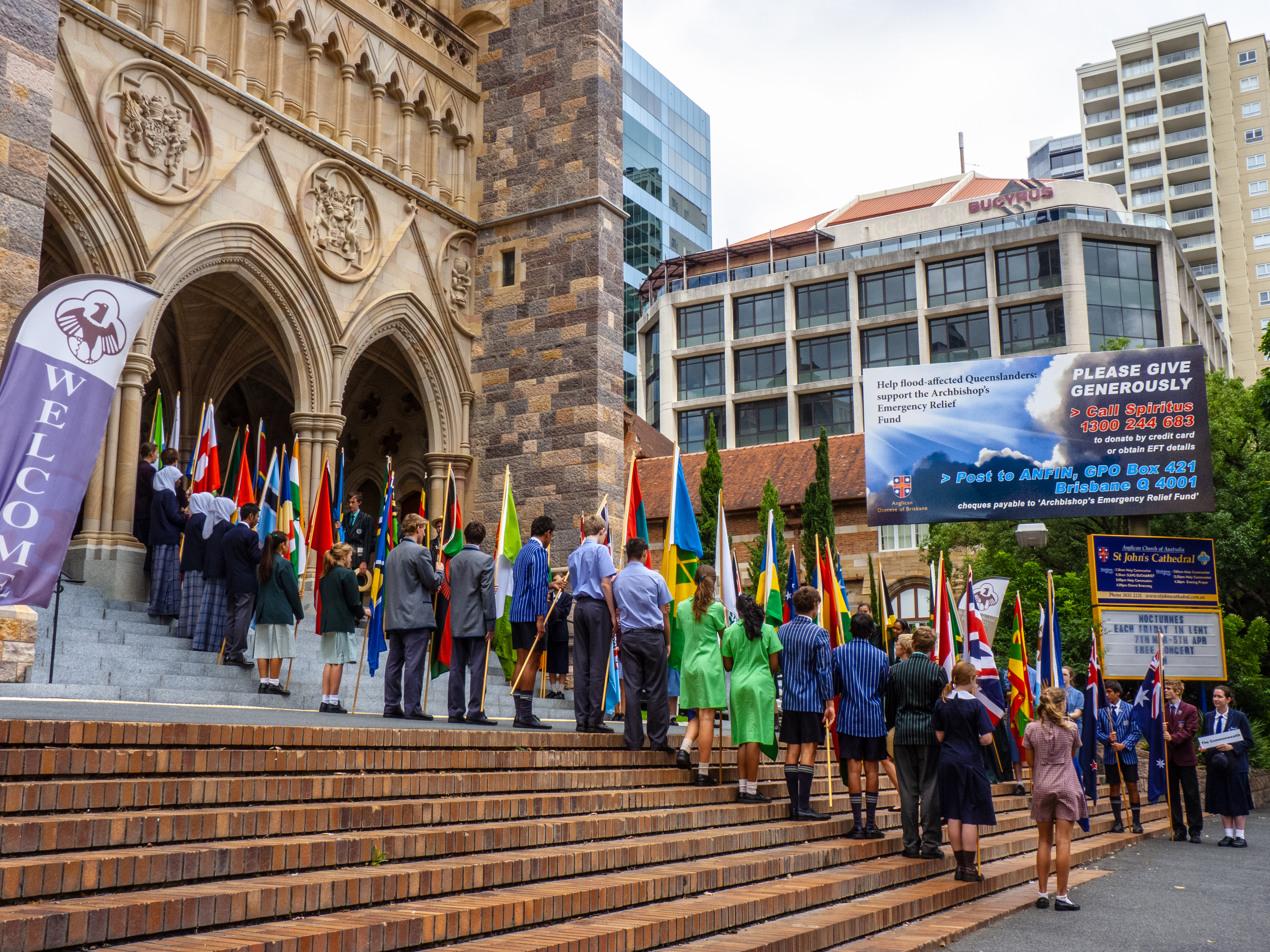
Commonwealth Day service at St John's Cathedral in Brisbane, 2011

Commonwealth Day is observed by the Australian governor-general and state governors. Per protocol, departments and agencies of the Australian Government fly the national flag. The Commonwealth Day Council of New South Wales holds an annual lunch in the presence of its patron, the governor, at Parliament House, Sydney.

=== Bahamas ===
In the Bahamas, Commonwealth Day school assemblies involving flag-raising ceremonies are held.

=== Belize ===
In Belize, Commonwealth Day was also known as Sovereign's Day, and was formerly celebrated as a public holiday in May. The holiday was originally celebrated in honour of Queen Victoria's birthday, although it was later set aside to recognise and celebrate the importance of being part of the Commonwealth of Nations. In 2021, Sovereign's Day was removed from the government's official list of public and bank holidays.

National Heroes and Benefactors Day is observed on the Monday closest to 9 March, unless it falls on a Saturday or it has been moved by decree. The day honours Edward Ernest Victor Bliss, 4th Baron Bliss, who bequeathed a significant sum to the nation.

=== Canada ===
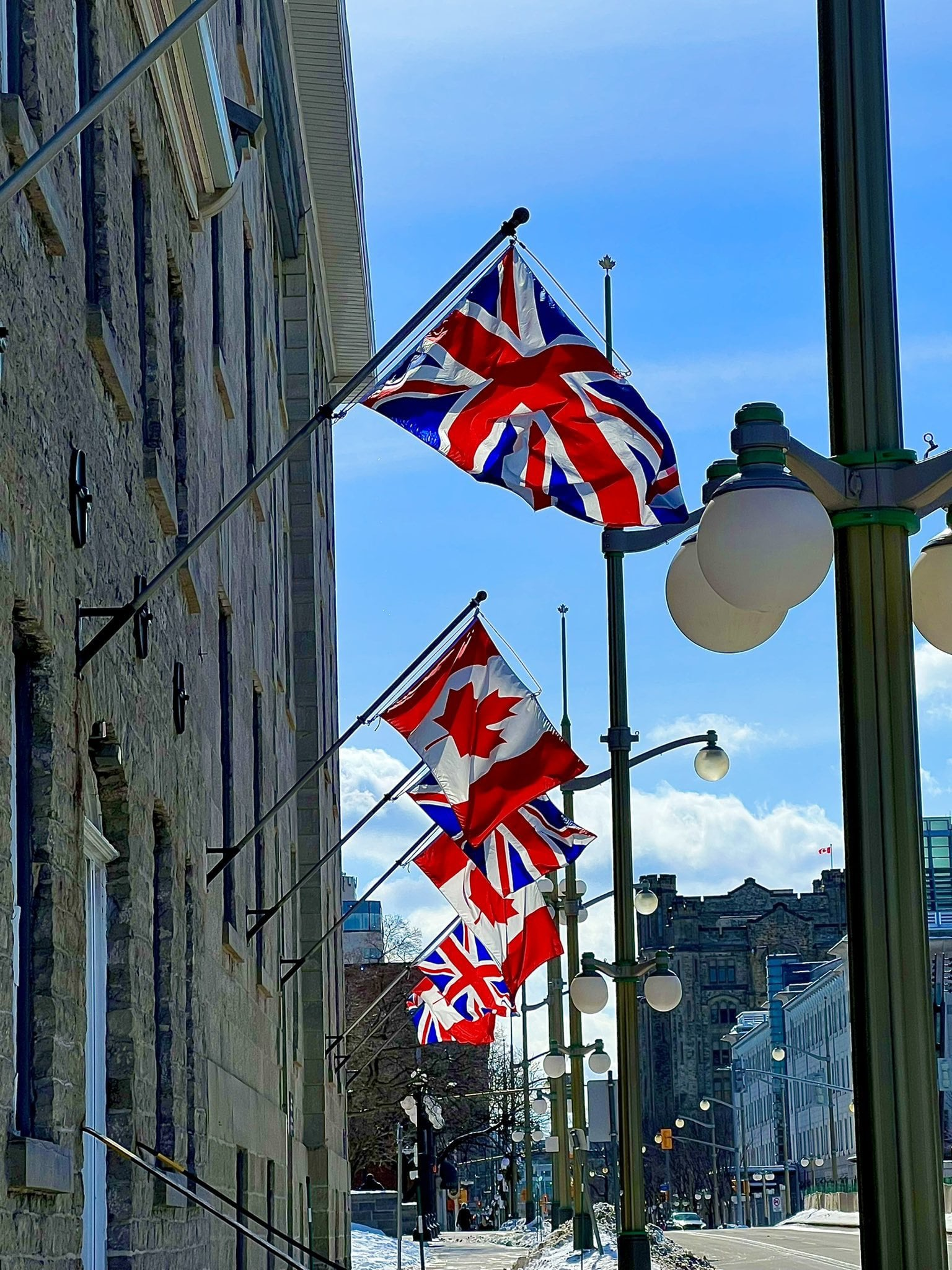
Royal Union Flags flown alongside the flag of Canada in Ottawa on Commonwealth Day, 2022

In Canada, the federal government directs that the Royal Union Flag is to be flown alongside the flag of Canada at federal installations nationwide where at least two flag poles are present. The requirement to fly the Royal Union Flag on certain days, including Commonwealth Day, stems from a 1964 parliamentary resolution following the adoption of flag of Canada, which retained the Royal Union Flag as an official symbol of the country's Commonwealth membership and allegiance to the Crown.

From 1898 to 1976, Empire Day/Commonwealth Day was observed on an ad hoc basis in conjunction with Victoria Day, a federal statutory holiday in May that also serves as the sovereign's official birthday in Canada. Empire Day/Commonwealth Day was held on the weekday before Victoria Day and was not intended to be a general holiday in itself, but a day to provide schools and civic institutions the opportunity to implement activities and lessons on Canada and the British Empire. In 1977, Commonwealth Day was moved to the second Monday in March, in line with the rest of the Commonwealth of Nations.

=== Hong Kong ===
Prior to the 1997 transfer of sovereignty from the United Kingdom to the People's Republic of China, Commonwealth Day was a school holiday in the then-colony. Hongkong Post would also issue commemorative stamps. Post-handover, the event continues to be celebrated by the Royal Commonwealth Society's Hong Kong Branch. The celebrations include a ceremony at the Cenotaph, where the Commonwealth flag is raised, poppy wreaths are laid and prayers read to commemorate the sacrifice of Commonwealth servicemen who fought in the Battle of Hong Kong during World War II. Other Commonwealth groups also participate in the commemoration service. There is also an interfaith observance modelled on the annual Service of Celebration held in Westminster Abbey where religious leaders light candles and pray for peace, followed by an official reception held at the Hong Kong Club where the King's Commonwealth Day Message is read. The responsibility for reading the message is rotated each year amongst Commonwealth consuls-general in Hong Kong.

=== Tuvalu ===
Commonwealth Day is observed as a public holiday in Tuvalu, as legislated in the country's Public Holidays Act.

== Commonwealth Day themes ==
Year	Theme
1995	Our Commonwealth Neighbourhood – Working Together for Tolerance and Understanding
1996	Our Working Partnership
1997	Talking to One Another
1998	Sport Brings Us Together
1999	Music
2000	Sharing Knowledge – The Communications Challenge
2001	A New Generation
2002	Diversity
2003	Partners in Development
2004	Building a Commonwealth of Freedom
2005	Education – Creating Opportunity, Realising Potential
2006	Health and Vitality
2007	Respecting Difference, Promoting Understanding
2008	The Environment, Our Future
2009	Commonwealth@60 – Serving a New Generation
2010	Science, Technology and Society
2011	Women as Agents of Change
2012	Connecting Cultures
2013	Opportunity through Enterprise
2014	Team Commonwealth
2015	A Young Commonwealth
2016	An Inclusive Commonwealth
2017	A Peace-building Commonwealth
2018	Towards A Common Future
2019	A Connected Commonwealth
2020	Delivering a Common Future
2021	Delivering a Common Future
2022	Delivering a Common Future: Connecting, Innovating, Transforming
2023	Forging a Sustainable and Peaceful Common Future
2024	One Resilient Common Future: Transforming our Common Wealth
2025	Together We Thrive
2026	Unlocking opportunities together for a prosperous Commonwealth

== See also ==
- Empire Air Day
