= List of Reginald Fessenden patents =

The list of Reginald Fessenden patents contains the innovation of his pioneering experiments. Reginald Aubrey Fessenden received hundreds of patents for devices in fields such as high-powered transmitting, sonar, and television.

== Patents ==
- U.S. patent 452,494, "Lead-in Wire for Incandescent Electric Lamps" – 18 February 1891
- U.S. patent 453,742, "Manufacture of Incandescent Electric Lamps" – 9 June 1891
- U.S. patent 506,311, "Molding for Electrical Conductors" – 10 October 1893
- U.S. patent 638,837, "Pencil for Incandescent Lamps" – 12 December 1899
- U.S. patent 638,838, "Pencil for Incandescent Lamps" – 12 December 1899
- U.S. patent 638,839, "Incandescent Lamp" – 12 December 1899
- U.S. patent 638,840, "Incandescent Lamp" – 12 December 1899
- U.S. patent 639,161, "Incandescent Lamp" – 12 December 1899
- U.S. patent 644,972, "Induction Coil for X-ray Apparatus" – 6 March 1900
- U.S. patent 648,660, "X-ray Apparatus" – 1 May 1900
- U.S. patent 650,521, "Incandescent Lamp" – 29 May 1900
- U.S. patent 654,390, "Induction-coil" – July 1900
- U.S. patent 670,316, "Incandescent Lamp" – 19 March 1901
- U.S. patent 706,735, "Wireless Telegraphy" – 12 August 1902
- U.S. patent 706,736, "Apparatus for Wireless Telegraphy" – 12 August 1902
- U.S. patent 706,737, "Wireless Telegraphy" – 12 August 1902
- U.S. patent 706,738, "Wireless Telegraphy" – 12 August 1902
- U.S. patent 706,739, "Conductor for Wireless Telegraphy" – 12 August 1902
- U.S. patent 706,740, "Wireless Signaling" (heterodyne principle) – 12 August 1902
- U.S. patent 706,741, "Apparatus for Wireless Telegraphy" (compressed air spark gap transmitter) – 12 August 1902
- U.S. patent 706,742, "Wireless Signaling", – 12 August 1902 (transmit-receive switch)
- U.S. patent 706,743, "Wireless Signaling", – 12 August 1902
- U.S. patent 706,744, "Current Actuated Wave Responsive Device" ("barretter" detector) – August 1902
- U.S. patent 706,745, "Signaling by Electromagnetic Waves" – issued 12 August 1902
- U.S. patent 706,746, "Signaling by Electromagnetic Waves" (ground plane) – 12 August 1902
- U.S. patent 706,747, "Apparatus for Signaling by Electromagnetic Waves" (voice modulation of 50 kHz alternator – continuous wave transmitter) – 12 August 1902
- U.S. patent 715,043, "Current Operated Receiver for Electromagnetic Waves" – 2 December 1902
- U.S. patent 715,203, "Selective Signaling by Electromagnetic Waves" (multiplex transmission and reception) – 2 December 1902
- U.S. patent 727,325, "Transmission and Receipt of Signals" – 5 May 1903
- U.S. patent 727,326, "Selective Signaling by Electromagnetic Waves" – 5 May 1903
- U.S. patent 727,327, "Receiver for Electromagnetic Waves" – 5 May 1903
- U.S. patent 727,328, "Receiver for Signaling" – 5 May 1903
- U.S. patent 727,329, "Signaling by Electromagnetic Waves" – 5 May 1903
- U.S. patent 727,330, "Signaling by Electromagnetic Waves" – May 1903
- U.S. patent 727,331, "Receiver for Electromagnetic Waves" (improved "barretter"—actually electrolytic detector) – May 1903
- U.S. patent 730,753, "Signaling by Electromagnetic Waves" – 9 June 1903
- U.S. patent 731,029, "Method of Utilizing the Energy of Waves" – 16 June 1903
- U.S. patent 742,779, "Signaling by Electromagnetic Waves" – 27 October 1903
- U.S. patent 742,780, "Signaling by Electromagnetic Waves" – 27 October 1903
- U.S. patent 752,894, "Selective Signaling" – 23 February 1904
- U.S. patent 752,895, "Signaling by Electromagnetic Waves" – 23 February 1904
- U.S. patent 753,864, "Signaling by Electromagnetic Waves" – 8 March 1904
- U.S. patent 754,058, "Signaling by Electromagnetic Waves" – 8 March 1904
- U.S. patent 777,014, "Apparatus for Transmitting and Receiving Signals" – 6 December 1904
- U.S. patent 793,648, "Receiver for Electromagnetic Waves" (sealed/pressurized electrolytic detector) – 4 July 1905
- U.S. patent 793,649, "Signaling by Electromagnetic Waves" – 4 July 1905
- U.S. patent 793,650, "Signaling by Electromagnetic Waves" – 4 July 1905
- U.S. patent 793,651, "Aerial for Wireless Signaling" (shows insulated base) – 4 July 1905
- U.S. patent 793,652, "Signaling by Electromagnetic Waves" (shows the Brant Rock tower) – 4 July 1905
- U.S. patent 793,718, "Wireless Telegraphy" – 4 July 1905
- U.S. patent 793,777, "Condenser" – 4 July 1905
- U.S. patent 814,951, "Capacity" – 13 March 1906
- U.S. patent 897,278, "Wireless Telegraphy" – 1 September 1908
- U.S. patent 915,280, "Electric Signaling" – 16 March 1909
- U.S. patent 916,429, "Receiver for Electromagnetic Waves" – 30 March 1909
- U.S. patent 918,307, "Apparatus for Wireless Signaling" – 13 April 1909
- U.S. patent 928,371, "Signaling by Electromagnetic Waves" – 20 July 1909
- U.S. patent 932,111, "Producing High Frequency Oscillations" – 24 August 1909
- U.S. patent 938,836, "Method for Cleaning Guns" – 2 November 1909
- U.S. patent 941,565, "Method for Determining Positions of Vessels" – 30 November 1909
- U.S. patent 948,068, "Wireless Telegraphy" (antenna tuning) – 1 February 1910
- U.S. patent 956,489, "Signaling by Electromagnetic Waves" – 26 April 1910
- U.S. patent 960,631, "Wireless Signaling" – 7 June 1910
- U.S. patent 962,016, "Receiver for Electromagnetic Waves" – 21 June 1910
- U.S. patent 962,018, "Method of Signaling" – 21 June 1910
- U.S. patent 974,762, "Improvements in Wireless Telegraphy" – 1 November 1910
- U.S. patent 979,145, "Electrical Signaling" – 20 December 1910
- U.S. patent 998,567, "Signaling by Electromagnetic Waves" – 18 July 1911
- U.S. patent 1,002,051, "Signaling by Electromagnetic Waves" – 29 August 1911
- U.S. patent 1,002,052, "Electrical Signaling" – 29 August 1911
- U.S. patent 1,002,141, "Determining Positions of Vessels" – 29 August 1911
- U.S. patent 1,015,881, "Means for the Transmission of Energy by Electromagnetic Waves" – 30 January 1912
- U.S. patent 1,019,236, "Signaling" – 5 March 1912
- U.S. patent 1,020,032, "Signaling by Electromagnetic Waves" – 12 March 1912
- U.S. patent 1,022,540, "Wireless Signaling" – 9 April 1912
- U.S. patent 1,035,304, "Wireless Telegraphy" – 13 August 1912
- U.S. patent 1,039,717, "High Frequency Electrical Conductor" – 1 October 1912
- U.S. patent 1,048,670, "Contact for Electromagnetic Mechanism" – 31 December 1912
- U.S. patent 1,050,441, "Electrical Signaling Apparatus" – 1925
- U.S. patent 1,059,665, "Wireless Telegraphy" (antenna tuning)– April 1913
- U.S. patent 1,108,895, "Signaling by Sound and Other Longitudinal Elastic Impulses" – 1 September 1914
- U.S. patent 1,121,722, "Agricultural Engineering" – 22 December 1914
- U.S. patent 1,126,966, "Sending Mechanism for Electromagnetic Waves" – 2 February 1916
- U.S. patent 1,132,465, "Apparatus for Converting Heat into Work" – 16 March 1915
- U.S. patent 1,132,568, "Electric Signaling" – 23 March 1915
- U.S. patent 1,132,569, "Wireless Telegraphy" – 23 March 1915
- U.S. patent 1,141,386, "Method of Transmitting and Receiving Electrical Energy" – 1 June 1915
- U.S. patent 1,147,010, "Improvements in Wireless Telegraphy" – 20 July 1915
- U.S. patent 1,154,750, "Amplifying Electrical Impulses" – 28 September 1915
- U.S. patent 1,156,677, "Apparatus for the transmission by electrical oscillation" – 12 October 1915
- U.S. patent 1,158,123, "Apparatus for Generating and Receiving Electromagnetic Waves" – 26 October 1915
- U.S. patent 1,158,124, "Signaling Apparatus Aerial Navigation" – 26 October 1915
- U.S. patent 1,165,862, "Apparatus for Wireless Signaling" – 28 December 1915
- U.S. patent 1,166,892, "Apparatus for Producing High Frequency Oscillations" – 4 January 1916
- U.S. patent 1,167,366, "Dynamo-Electric Machinery" – 4 January 1916
- U.S. patent 1,170,969, "Means of Transmitting Intelligence" – 8 February 1916
- U.S. patent 1,172,017, "Method of Transmitting Energy by Electromagnetic Waves" – 15 February 1916
- U.S. patent 1,172,018, "Electromagnetic Indicator" – 15 February 1916
- U.S. patent 1,178,507, "Wireless Signaling" – 11 April 1916
- U.S. patent 1,184,843, "Signaling by Electromagnetic Waves" – 30 May 1916
- U.S. patent 1,191,072, "Method of Using Pulverulent Matter As Fuel" – 11 July 1916
- U.S. patent 1,207,388, "Method and Apparatus for Submarine Signaling" – 5 December 1916
- U.S. patent 1,212,202, "Submarine, Subterranean, and Aerial Telephony" – 16 January 1917
- U.S. patent 1,213,176, "Apparatus for Phonograph Kinetoscopes" – 23 January 1917
- U.S. patent 1,217,165, "Power Plant" – 27, February 1917
- U.S. patent 1,240,328, "Method and Apparatus for Finding Ore Bodies" – 18 September 1917
- U.S. patent 1,247,520, "Method for Storing Power" – 20 November 1917
- U.S. patent 1,265,068, "Method and Apparatus for Producing Alternating Currents" – 7 May 1918
- U.S. patent 1,268,949, "Method and Apparatus for Agricultural Engineering" – 11 June 1918
- U.S. patent 1,270,398, "Method and Apparatus for Transmitting and Receiving Sound Waves Through Ground" – 25 June 1918
- U.S. patent 1,291,458, "Apparatus for Submarines" – 4 January 1919
- U.S. patent 1,318,740, "Method of and Apparatus for Obtaining Increased Circulation" – 14 October 1919
- U.S. patent 1,319,145, "Detecting and Locating Ships" – 21 October 1919
- U.S. patent 1,348,825, "Method of and Apparatus for Detecting Low Frequency Impulses" – 3 August 1920
- U.S. patent 1,348,826, "Method and Apparatus for Submarine Signaling and Detection" – 3 August 1920
- U.S. patent 1,348,827, "Method and Apparatus for Submarine Signaling" – 3 August 1920
- U.S. patent 1,348,828, "Method and Apparatus for Sound Insulation" – 3 August 1920
- U.S. patent 1,348,855, "Method and Apparatus for Detecting Submarines" – 10 August 1920
- U.S. patent 1,374,293, "Wireless Direction Finder" – 12 April 1921
- U.S. patent 1,384,014, "Method and Apparatus for Signaling and Otherwise Utilizing Radiant Impulses" – 5 July 1921
- U.S. patent 1,384,029, "Sound-Signaling" – 5 July 1921
- U.S. patent 1,384,556, "Apparatus for Submarine Signaling" – 3 August 1920
- U.S. patent 1,394,482, "Submarine Signaling" – 18 October 1921
- U.S. patent 1,394,483, "Method and Apparatus for Submarine Signaling" – 18 October 1921
- U.S. patent 1,397,949, "Method and Apparatus for Submarine Signaling" – 22 November 1921
- U.S. patent 1,414,077, "Method and Apparatus for Inspecting Material" – 25 April 1922
- U.S. patent 1,415,539, "Method and Apparatus for Submarine Signaling" – 9 May 1922
- U.S. patent 1,429,497, "Method and Apparatus for Detecting, Measuring, and Utilizing Low Frequency Impulses" – 19 September 1922
- U.S. patent 1,453,316, "Acoustic Method and Apparatus" – 1 May 1923
- U.S. patent 1,472,558, "Directional Receiving of Submarine Signals" – 30 October 1923
- U.S. patent 1,473,979, "Method for Eliminating Undesired Impulses" – 6 November 1923
- U.S. patent 1,534,205, "Eliminating Disturbing Energy" – 21 April 1925
- U.S. patent 1,547,740, "Means for Eliminating Disturbing Noises" – 28 July 1925
- U.S. patent 1,553,152, "Method and Apparatus for Generating Electrical Oscillations" – 8 September 1925
- U.S. patent 1,561,441, "Apparatus for Directive Signaling" – 10 November 1925
- U.S. patent 1,576,735, "Infusor" (for making tea) – March 1926
- U.S. patent 1,616,416, "Method and Apparatus for Coordinating Radio and Phonograph Reproductions" – 1 February 1927
- U.S. patent 1,617,241, "Method and Apparatus for the Transmission of Energy by High Frequency Impulses" – 8 February 1927
- U.S. patent 1,863,841, "Method and Apparatus for Coordinating Radio and Phonograph Reproductions" – 21 June 1932
- U.S. patent 1,882,183, "Means for Parking Cars" – 11 October 1932
- U.S. patent 1,899,026, "Means for Modulating Electrical Energy by Light Impulses" – 28 February 1933
- U.S. patent 1,901,503, "Rotary Brush" – 14 March 1933
- U.S. patent 1,965,226, "Method and Apparatus for Sound Transmission" – 3 July 1934
- U.S. patent 1,991,892, "Height Indicator" – 19 February 1935
- U.S. patent 2,059,221, "Television System" – 3 November 1936
- U.S. patent 2,059,222, "Television Apparatus" – 3 November 1936

== Reissued ==
- U.S. patent RE12115 "Receiver for Electromagnetic Waves" – duplicate of 727,331 reissued May 1903
- U.S. patent RE12168 "Wireless Telegraphy" – duplicate of 706,737 reissued 10 November 1903
- U.S. patent RE12169 "Wireless Telegraphy" – duplicate of 706,737 reissued 10 November 1903
- U.S. patent RE16372 "Acoustic Method and Apparatus" – duplicate of 1,453,316 reissued 10 29 June 1926
