= Empire Air Day =

1930s annual air show in the United Kingdom

Empire Air Day was an annual air show open to the public held at Royal Air Force (RAF) stations in the United Kingdom in the 1930s. According to a speech on by Anthony Muirhead in the House of Commons recorded in Hansard, "The idea of Empire Air Day is that the public should be enabled to see the Royal Air Force at its everyday work. As many stations as possible... are opened to the public on payment of a small charge for admission. At each station a programme of flying is arranged." The first Empire Air Day was held on 24 May 1934; 90 years ago. The last Empire Air Day was held on 20 May 1939; 85 years ago.

== See also ==
- Empire Day (later Commonwealth Day)
- Category: Airshows in the United Kingdom
