= Flag of the Commonwealth of Nations =

Commonwealth of Nations
- Commonwealth flag as adopted in 2013
- Use: Other
- Proportion: 3:5 or 1:2
- Adopted: 26 March 1976; modified 12 November 2013
- Design: A gold globe, surrounded by 34 sunrays, on a blue field.

The flag of the Commonwealth of Nations is the official flag used by and representing the Commonwealth of Nations. Its current design dates to 2013, a modification of a design adopted in 1976.

== Description ==
The flag consists of the Commonwealth symbol in gold on a blue field. The symbol centres on a globe, representing the global nature of the Commonwealth and the breadth of its membership.

== History ==
The flag developed from car pennants produced for the first time at the 1973 Commonwealth Heads of Government Meeting, held in Ottawa, Ontario. The initiative for its design is credited to two Canadians: the first Commonwealth Secretary-General, Arnold Smith; and Prime Minister Pierre Trudeau. It was officially adopted on 26 March 1976.

=== Original design ===
The design of the Commonwealth Flag that was adopted in 1976

The original design featured a globe surrounded by 64 radiating, approximately quadrilateral, sunrays, which form a 'C' for 'Commonwealth'. The number of sunrays did not represent the number of member states (there have never been 64 members); instead, the large number represented the many ways in which the Commonwealth cooperates around the world. This flag used Pantone 286.

=== 2013 redesign ===
In 2013, the globe was tilted, and the number of sunrays reduced to 34. The colourings used in the flag were also slightly modified. The standard proportions of the flag are 3:5; however, a 1:2 version appears in countries whose flags use a 1:2 ratio, such as Australia and the UK. This flag used Pantone 280.

== Usage ==
The flag of the Commonwealth of Nations is flown at Marlborough House, London, the headquarters of the Commonwealth Secretariat, throughout the year, and for a limited period at other venues where Commonwealth meetings, events, or visits are taking place (for example, Commonwealth Heads of Government Meetings).

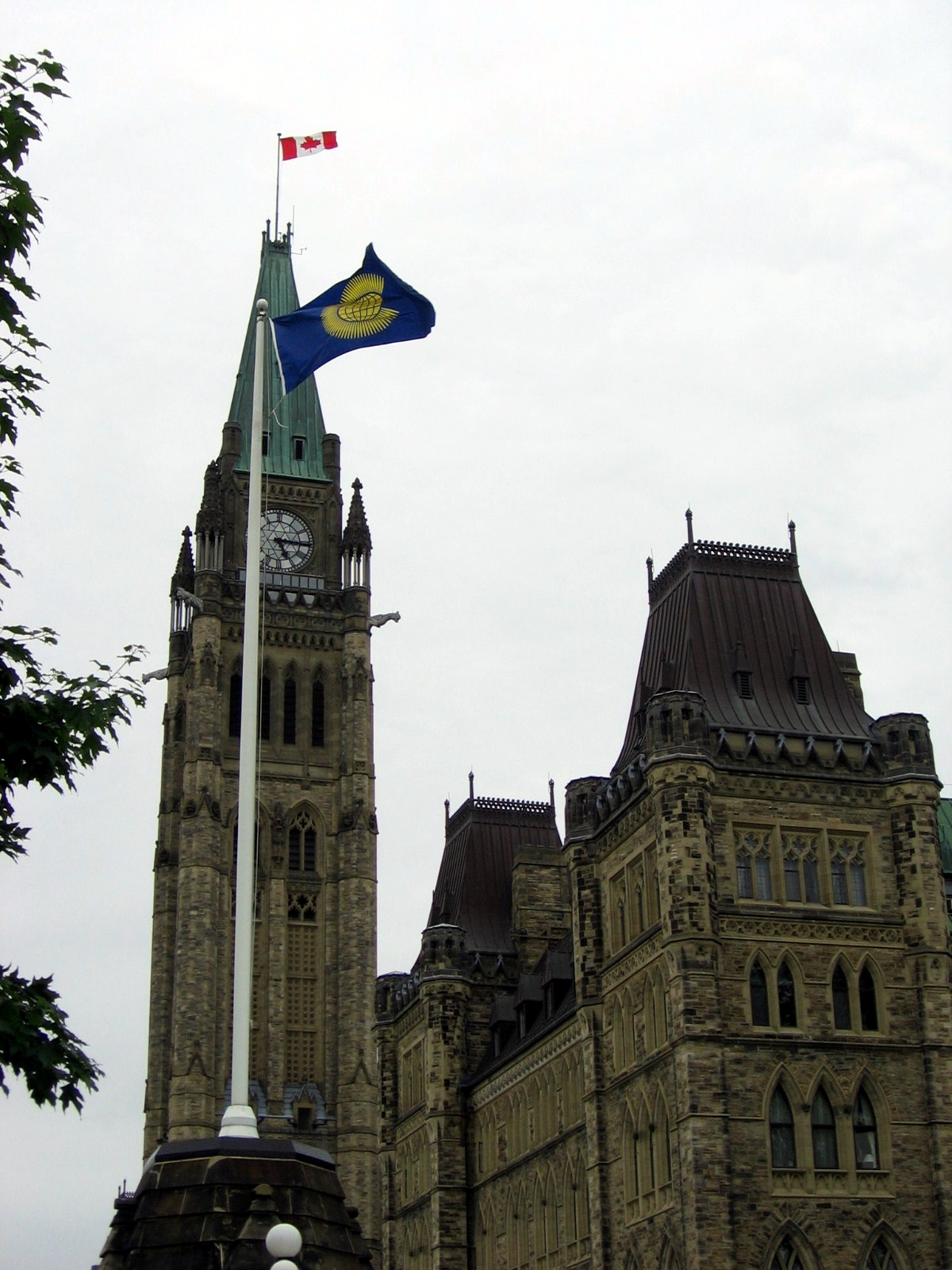
The original Commonwealth Flag design flying at the Canadian Parliament Buildings at Parliament Hill, Ottawa, in 2010

On 28 September 2016, the Welsh Conservative AM in the National Assembly for Wales Mohammad Asghar suggested that once the United Kingdom left the European Union, the Welsh Assembly should replace the EU Flag alongside the Union Flag and the Welsh Flag. It has been suggested that the Flag of the Commonwealth be the replacement. On 31 January 2020, Brexit was marked at the Gibraltar border with the lowering of the EU flag and the raising of the Commonwealth flag in its place.

=== Commonwealth Day ===
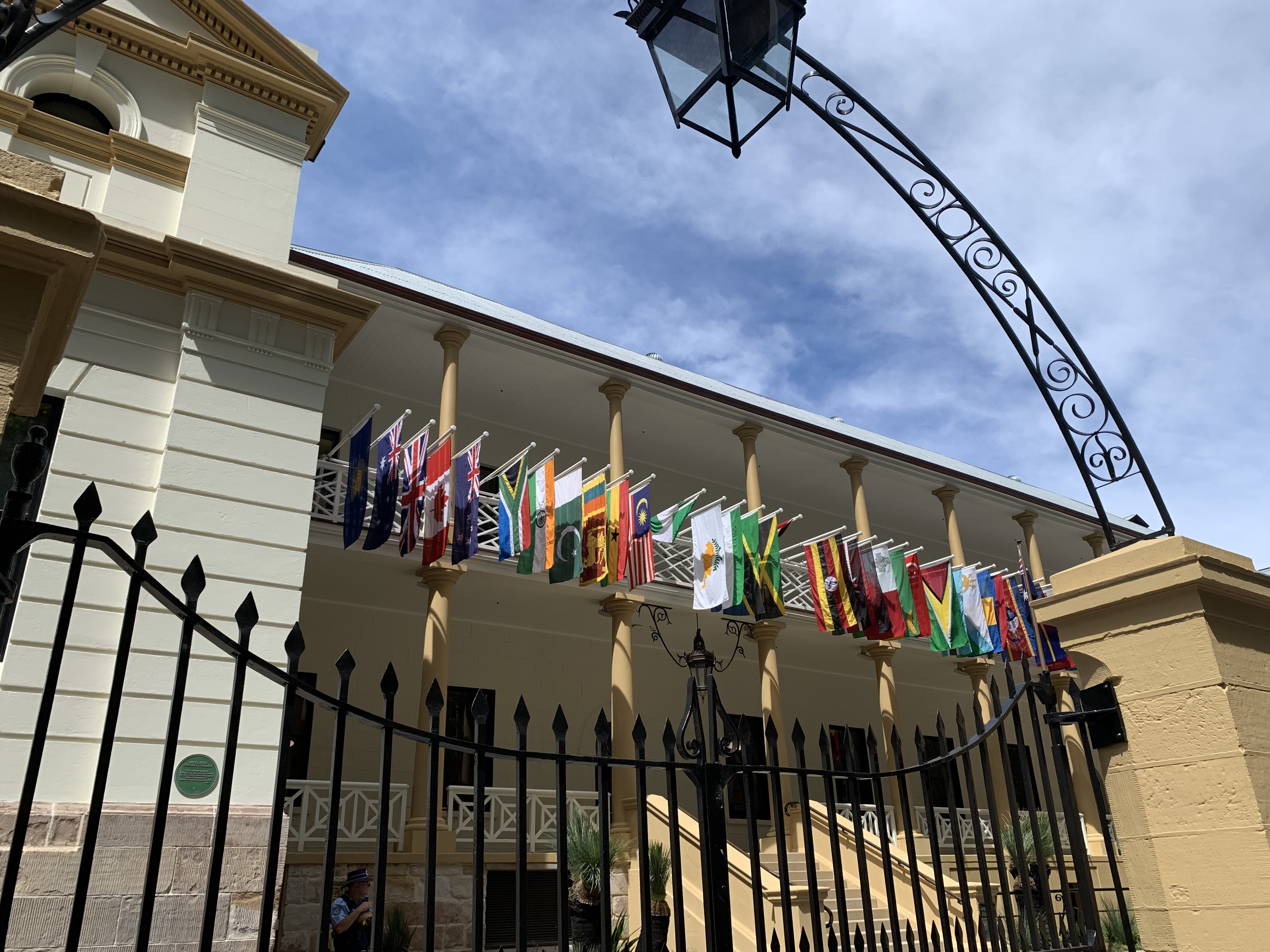
Commonwealth flag and those of constituent countries at Parliament House, Sydney on Commonwealth Day in 2024

Former Commonwealth Secretary-General Don McKinnon encourages the flying of the Commonwealth flag on Commonwealth Day (the second Monday in March), and the Office of the Secretary-General notes that "it is not the case that the Union Jack – or the flag of any other member country for that matter – is a substitute for the Commonwealth flag which represents the association of 53 members and their peoples." However, in Canada, the federal government directs its installations with a second flagpole to fly the Royal Union Flag instead, as that flag was the designated symbol in that country to represent its Commonwealth membership and allegiance to The Crown.

In the United Kingdom, the Commonwealth Flag is flown on Commonwealth Day at the Scottish Parliament Building in Edinburgh, alongside the Union Flag, the Scottish saltire, and the European Union flag, which latter three flying daily. Similar arrangements were made to fly the Commonwealth flag on Commonwealth Day, alongside the Union Flag, were made at the in Belfast in 2002. A similar arrangement was made at the Parliament Buildings in Belfast in 2002, with the Commonwealth flag flown alongside the Union Flag on Commonwealth Day. In Gibraltar, the flag has been flown since the territory's withdrawal from the European Union, replacing the Flag of the European Union. Prior to Brexit, it was raised on Commonwealth Day from the third flagpole at No. 6 Convent Place, the office of the Chief Minister, alongside the Union Flag and the flag of Gibraltar.

== Commonwealth Games ==
A ceremonial flag is used at the Commonwealth Games, the design of which has changed considerably over the years.

British Empire Games flag (1930–1950)

British Empire and Commonwealth Games flag (1954–1966)

British Commonwealth Games flag (1970–1974)

Commonwealth Games flag (1978–1998)

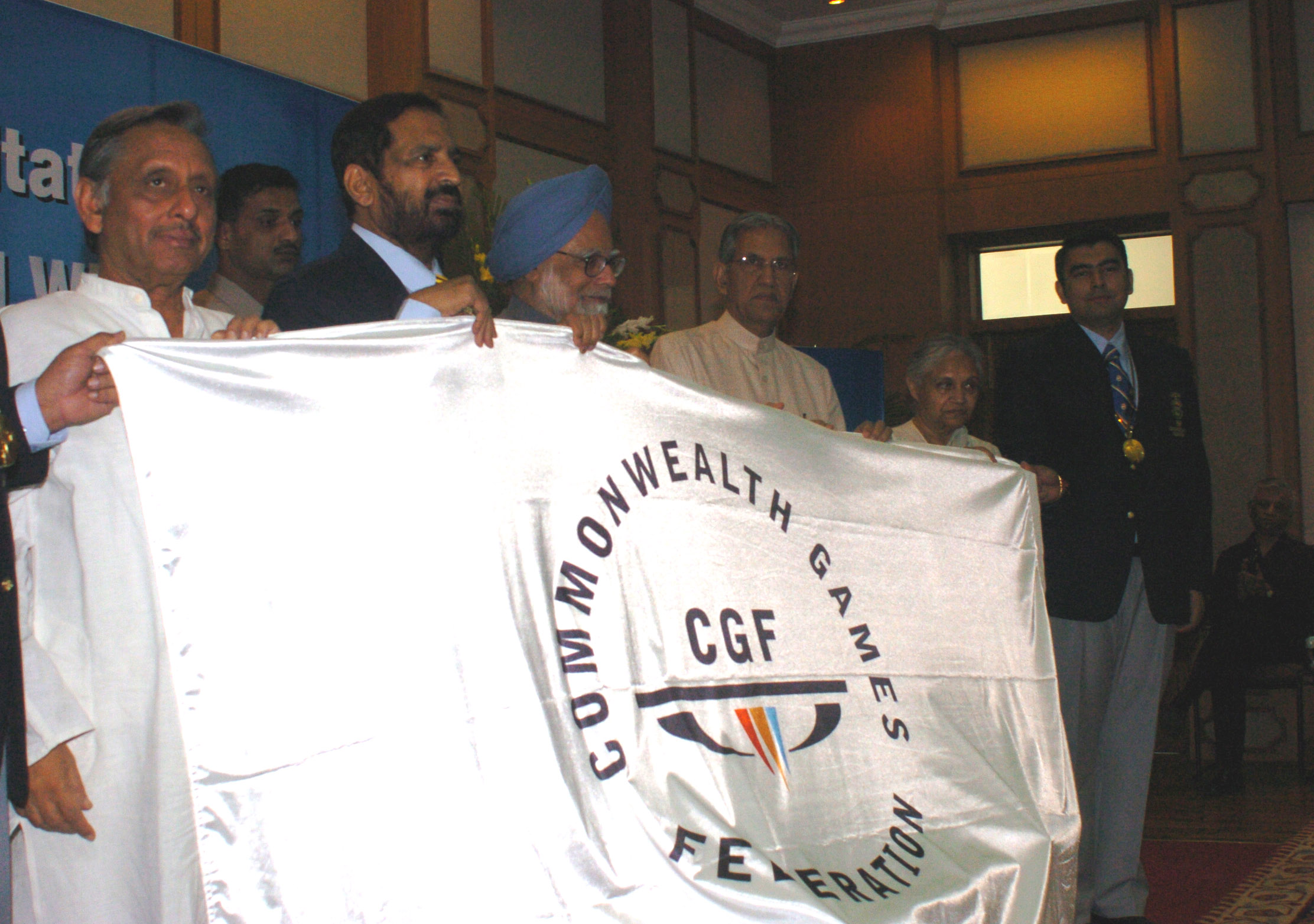
Commonwealth Games flag (2002–2018)

Commonwealth Games logo (2022–present)

== Gallery ==
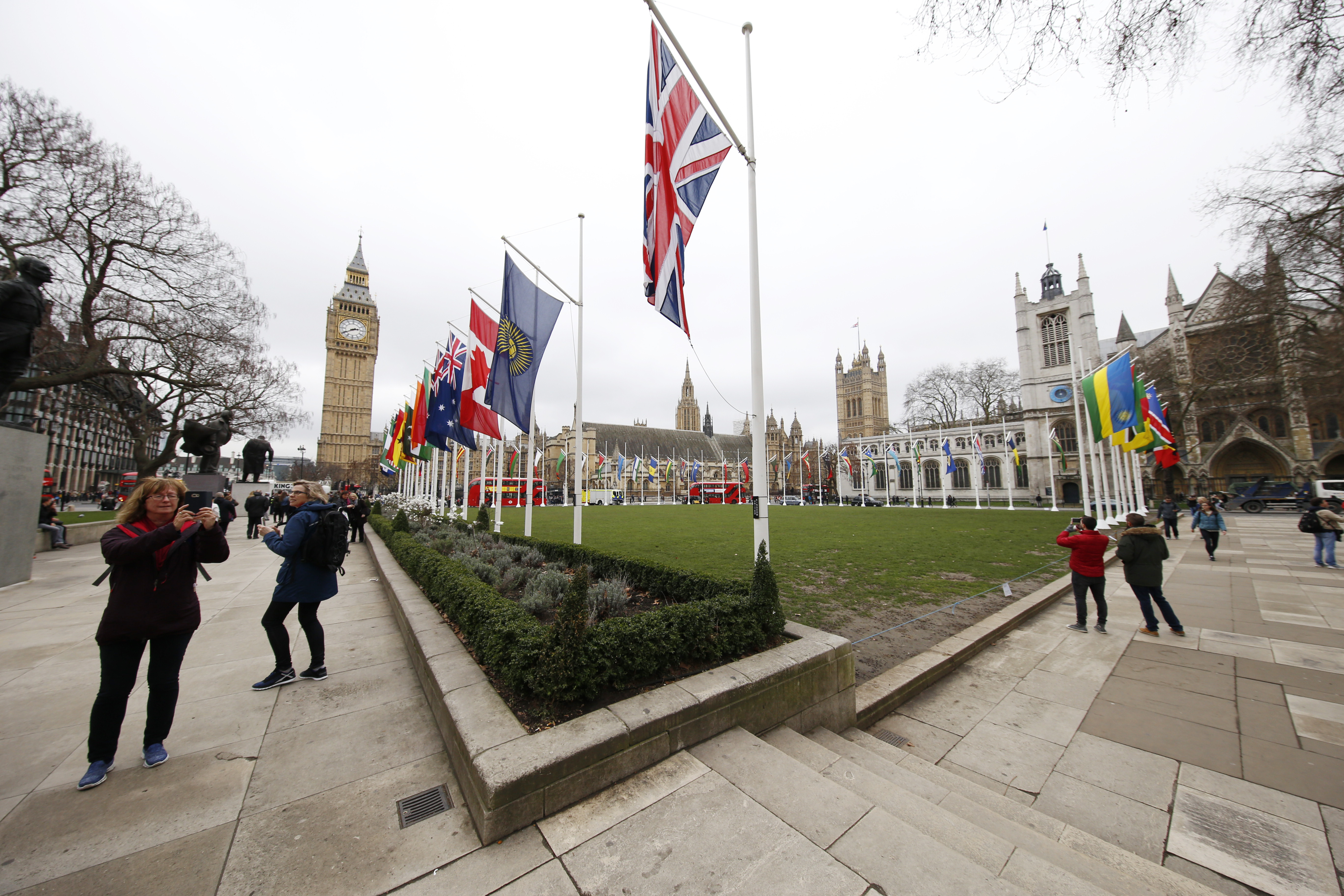
The Commonwealth Flag, as well as the flags of Commonwealth members, flying in Parliament Square on Commonwealth Day 2017

== See also ==
- British Empire flag
