= Ss. Peter and Paul, Wannsee =

Coordinates: 52°25′28″N 13°07′09″E

- SS. Peter and Paul
- St. Peter und Paul
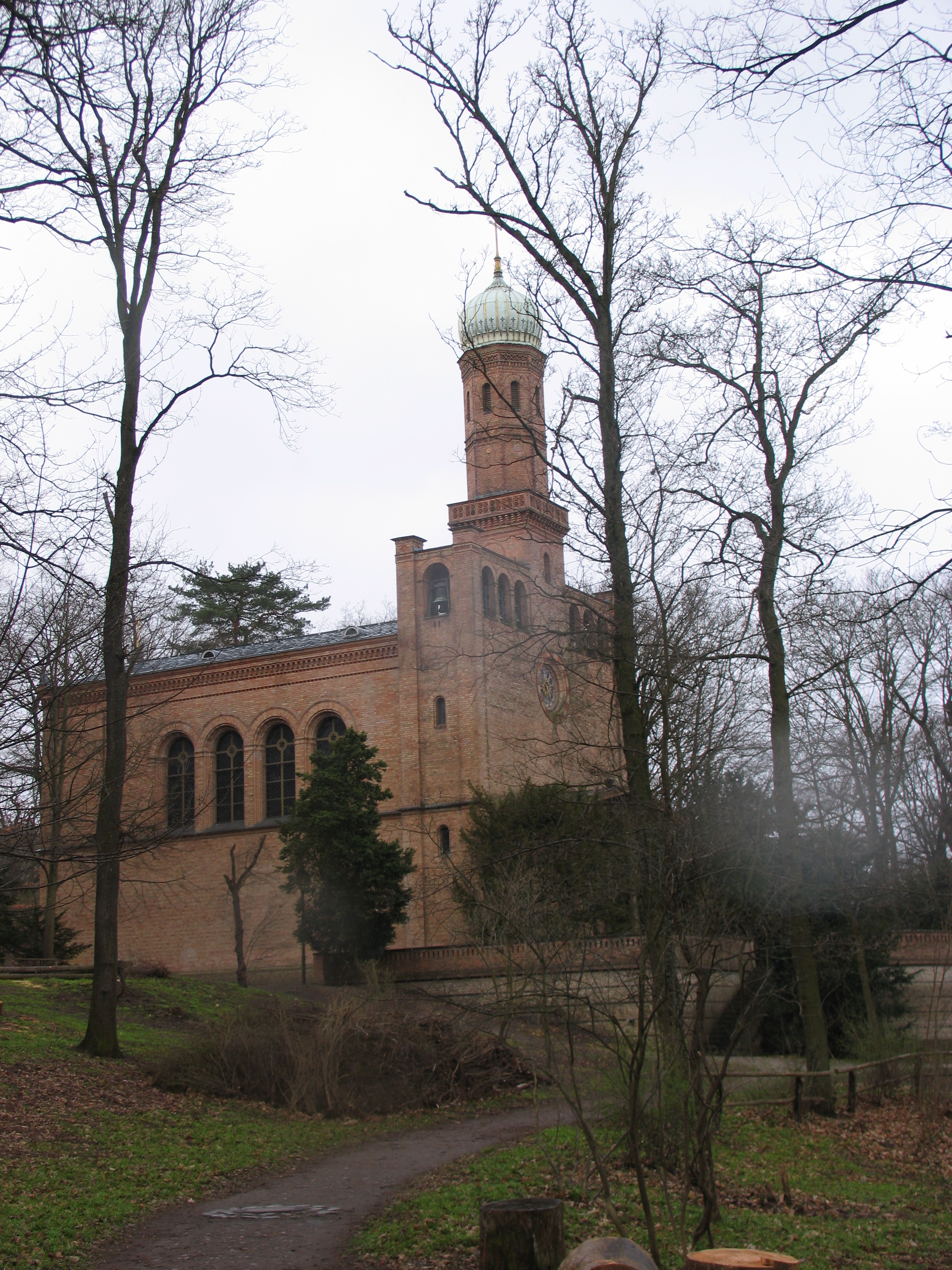
- Ss. Peter and Paul on Nikolskoë
- Location: Glienicke, Berlin
- Country: Germany
- Denomination: Protestant

History
- Founder: Frederick William III of Prussia

Architecture
- Heritage designation: UNESCO World Heritage Site
- Designated: 1990
- Style: Eastern Orthodox church architecture
- Years built: 1834-7

Administration
- Parish: none

UNESCO World Heritage Site
- Part of: Palaces and Parks of Potsdam and Berlin
- Criteria: Cultural: (i)(ii)(iv)
- Reference: 532ter
- Inscription: 1990 (14th Session)
- Extensions: 1992, 1999

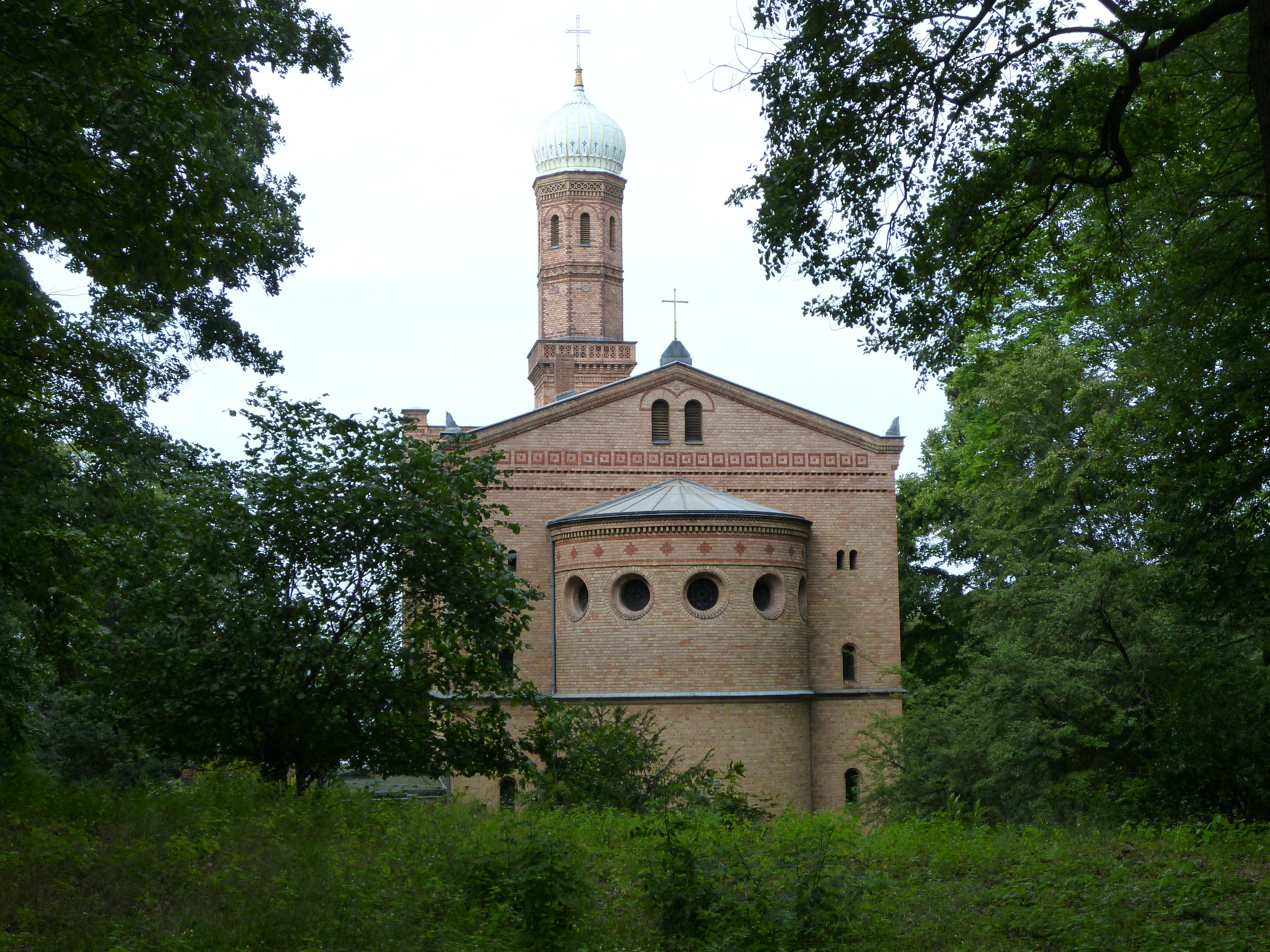

Ss. Peter and Paul Church on Nikolskoë is a Protestant church in the Volkspark Glienecke in Berlin, Germany. It is currently administered by the Evangelical Church of Berlin-Brandenburg-Silesian Upper Lusatia. The church is part of the UNESCO World Heritage Site Palaces and Parks of Potsdam and Berlin.

== History ==
King Friedrich Wilhelm III had the church built for the residents of Klein-Glienicke and Pfaueninsel on a bluff on the Havel near the Pfaueninsel and the Nikolskoë Blockhouse. It was designed by the architects Friedrich August Stüler and Albert Dietrich Schadow. Friedrich Wilhelm selected the Russian style to commemorate the marriage of his daughter Charlotte to the later Tsar Nicholas I of Russia. The king visited them at St. Petersburg in 1818 and for a return visit a year later had a Russian-style blockhouse built in the park at Glienicke, naming it Nikolskoë. In 1832, the king then ordered the construction of the nearby church which took place from 1834 to 1837.

It was inaugurated on August 13, 1837.

Until 1961, when the Berlin Wall cut the parish into three separate parts, Ss. Peter and Paul Church was part of the Evangelical Congregation of Neubabelsberg, then comprising a parish in Potsdam-Babelsberg, Klein-Glienicke (divided between Berlin and Potsdam), Nikolskoë and Potsdam-Sacrow with the further chapel in Klein-Glienicke and the Church of the Redeemer, Sacrow.

On December 22, 1941, the official German Evangelical Church called for suited actions by all Protestant church bodies to withhold baptised non-Aryans from all spheres of Protestant church life. Many German Christian-dominated congregations followed suit. However, the Evangelical Congregation of Neubabelsberg handed in a list of signatures in protest against the exclusion of the stigmatised Protestants of Jewish descent.

== Description ==
The church has a Russian Orthodox profile, with the noteworthy difference that it has only one onion dome, instead of the five usually seen in Russia.

Ss. Peter and Paul contains the grave of Prince Charles of Prussia. The design of its current glockenspiel is based on that of the Potsdam Garrison Church.

== Gallery ==
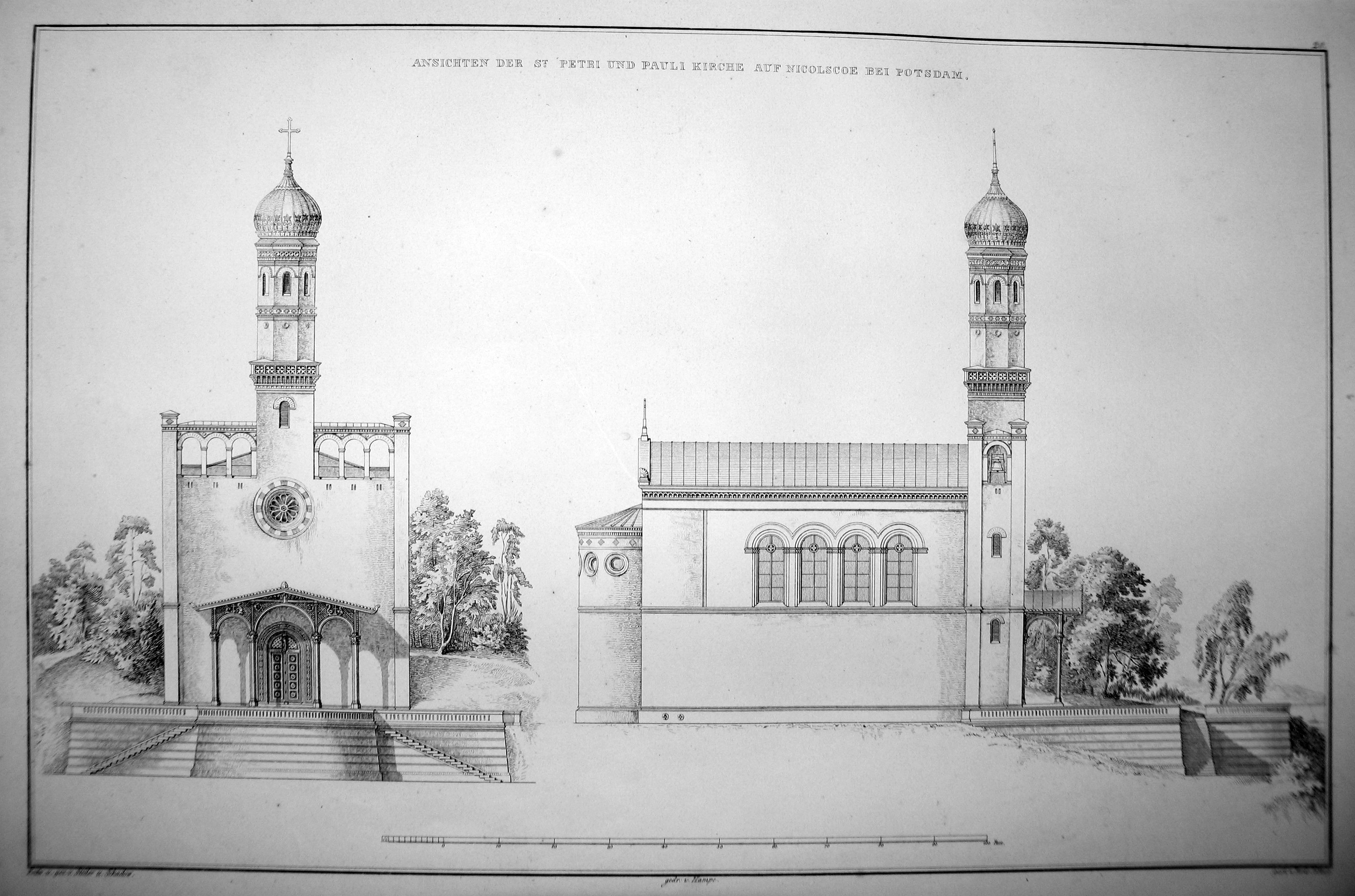
View of Ss. Peter and Paul from the Architektonisches Album (1842)

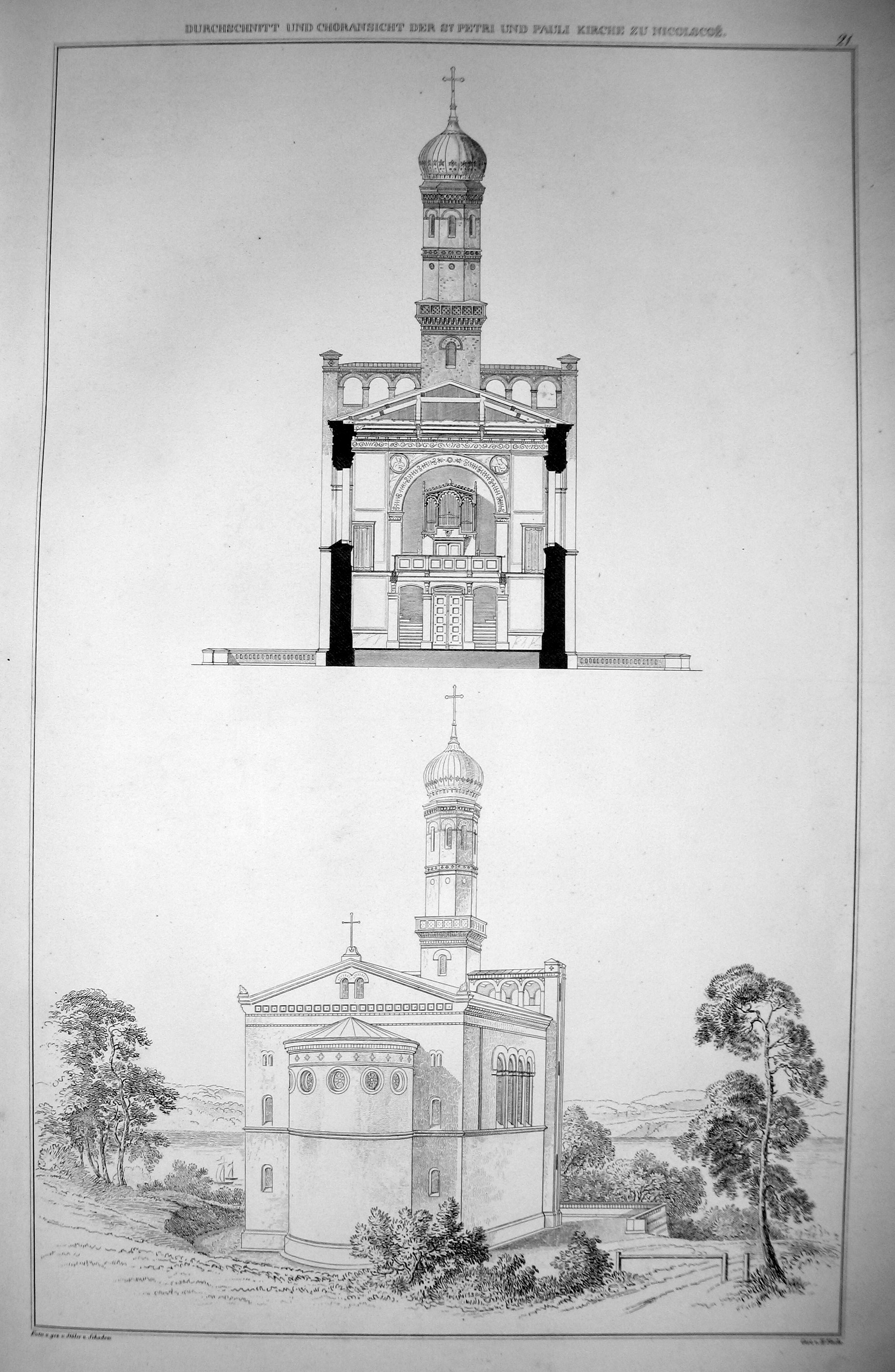
Cut out of Ss. Peter and Paul from the Architektonisches Album (1842)

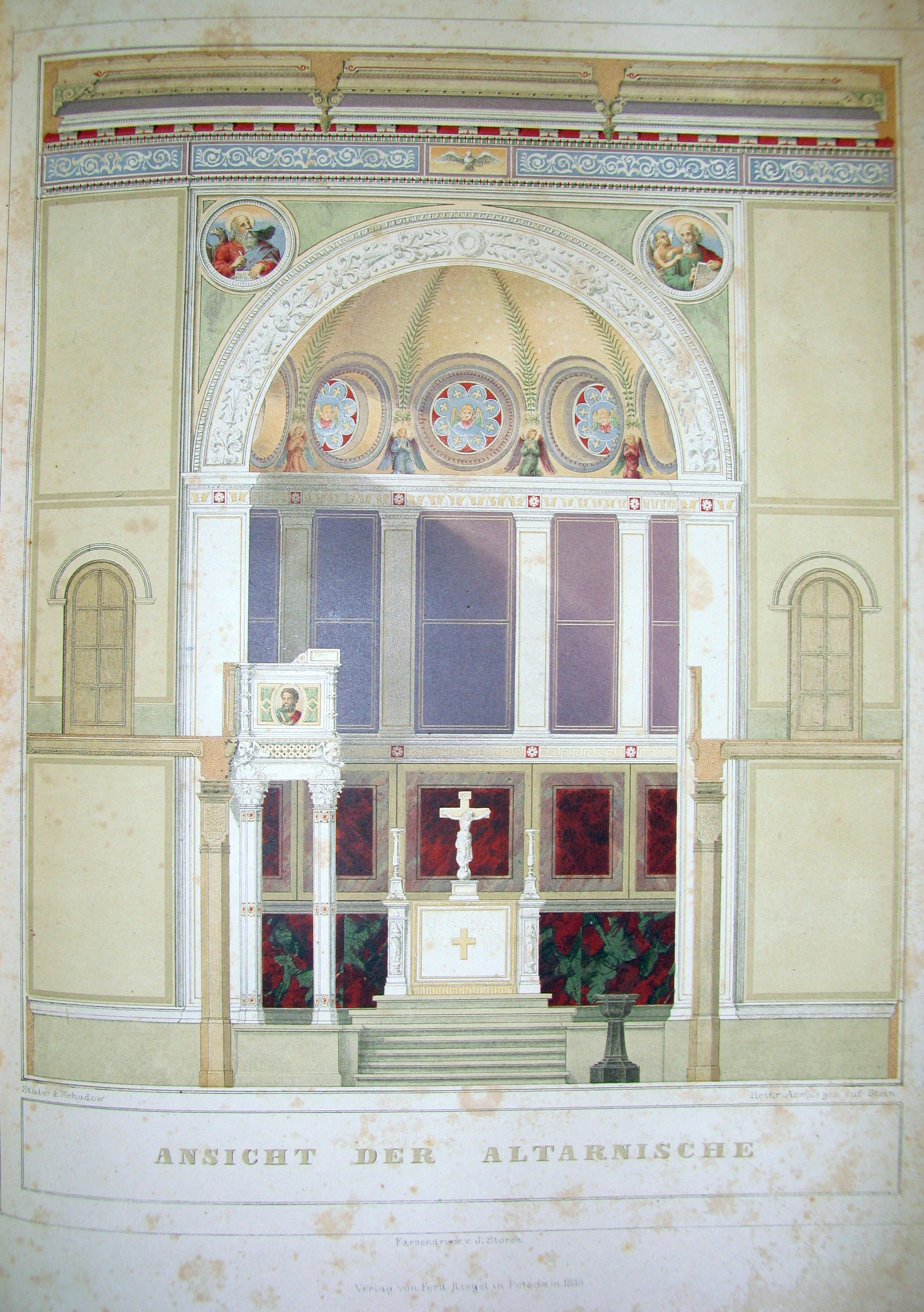
Altar of Ss. Peter and Paul from the Architektonisches Album (1842)
