= K. Ferdinand Braun =

German physicist (1850–1918)

Ferdinand Braun
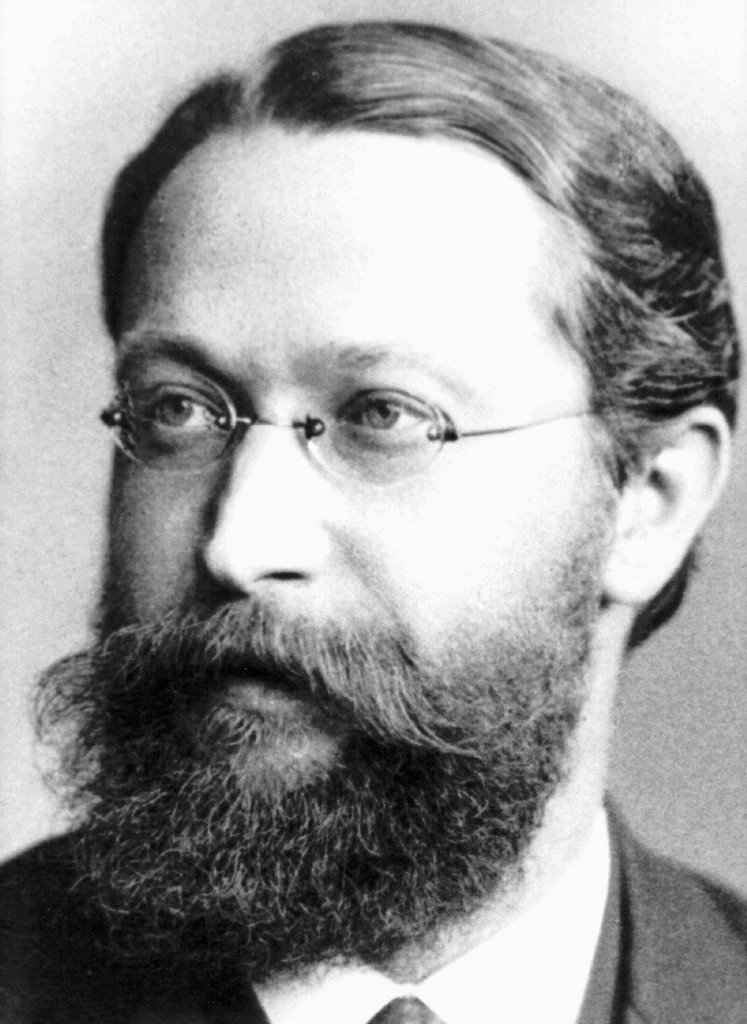
- Born: Karl Ferdinand Braun; 6 June 1850; Fulda, Electorate of Hesse
- Died: 20 April 1918 (aged 67); New York City, U.S.
- Education: Marburg University Friedrich Wilhelm University of Berlin: Dr. phil., Physics
- Known for: Cathode-ray tube; Crystal detector; Inductively coupled transmitter; Phased array
- Spouse: Amalie Buehler (m. 1885)
- Children: 5
- Awards: Nobel Prize in Physics (1909)
- Scientific career
- Fields: Physics
- Workplaces: University of Würzburg; St. Thomas School; Marburg University; University of Strasbourg; Karlsruhe Institute of Technology; University of Tübingen
- Thesis: Ueber den Einfluss von Steifigkeit, Befestigung und Amplitude auf die Schwingungen von Saiten (1872)
- Doctoral advisor: Georg Hermann Quincke
- Doctoral students: Richard Gans; Leonid Mandelstam; Nikolai Papaleksi; Godfrey Thomson

Karl Ferdinand Braun (German: [ˈfɛʁdinant ˈbʁaʊ̯n]; 6 June 1850 – 20 April 1918) was a German applied physicist who shared the 1909 Nobel Prize in Physics with Guglielmo Marconi for their contributions to the development of radio. With his two circuit system, long range radio transmissions and modern telecommunications were made possible. His invention of the phased array antenna in 1905 led to the development of radar, smart antennas, and MIMO. Braun built the first cathode-ray tube in 1897, which led to the development of television, and the first semiconductor diode in 1874, which co-started the development of electronics and electronics engineering.

Braun was a co-founder of Telefunken, one of the pioneering communications and television companies. He has been called the "father of television" (shared with inventors like Paul Nipkow), the "great-grandfather of every semiconductor ever manufactured," and a co-father of radiotelegraphy, together with Marconi, laying the foundation for all modern wireless systems.

== Biography ==
=== Education and career ===
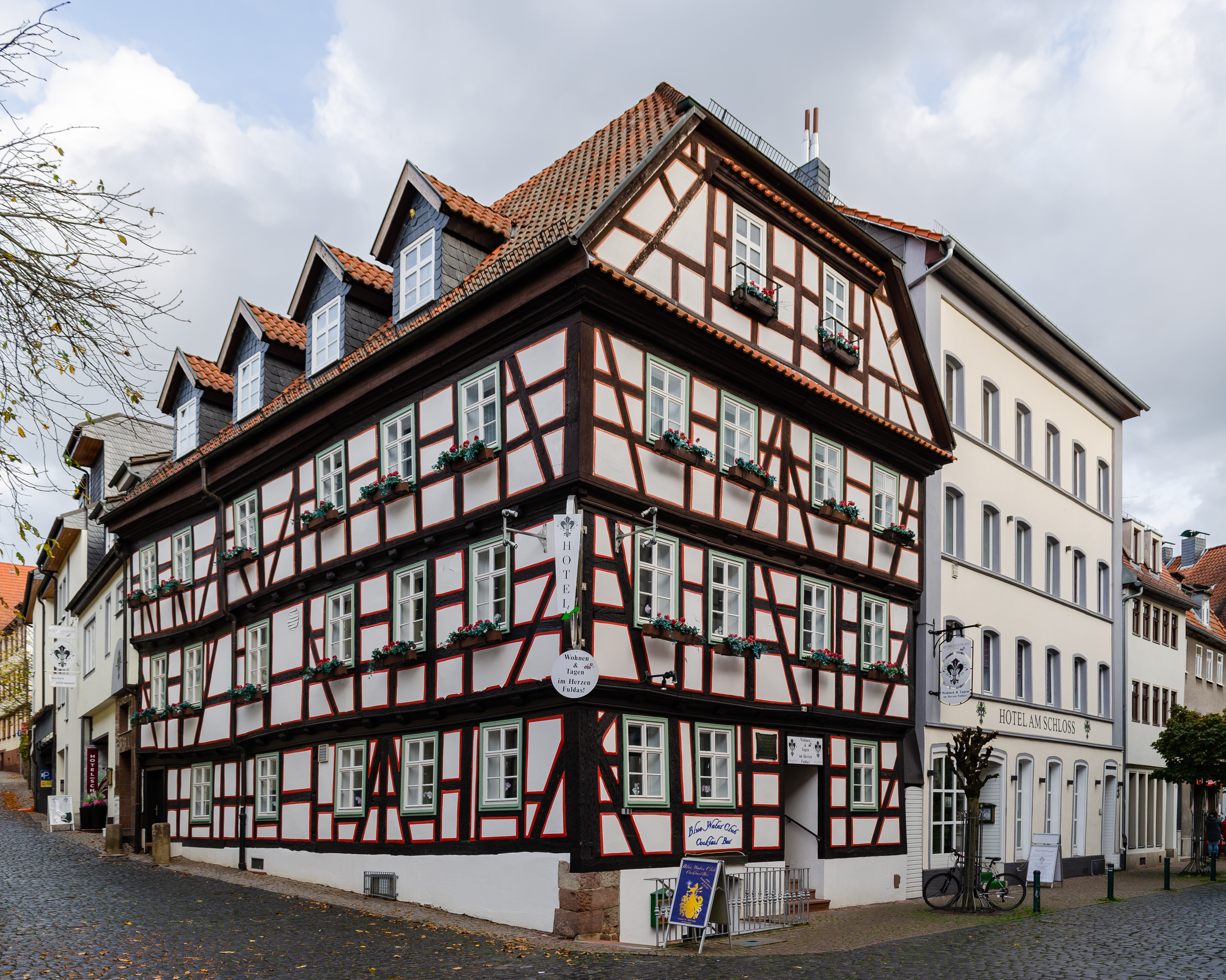
The house in Fulda, Germany, where Braun was born

Karl Ferdinand Braun was born on 6 June 1850 in Fulda, Electorate of Hesse, the son of Franziska (née Goehring) and Johann Konrad Braun. He studied physics, chemistry, and mathematics for one year at Marburg University, before transferring to the Friedrich Wilhelm University of Berlin (now the Humboldt University of Berlin) in 1869 as an assistant to Heinrich Gustav Magnus. After Magnus' death in 1870, Braun continued his training with Georg Hermann Quincke. In 1872, he received a Doctor of Philosophy for a thesis on vibrating strings, and subsequently followed Quincke to the University of Würzburg as an assistant.

Having passed the Staatsexamen in 1873, Braun was offered a teaching appointment in 1874 at St. Thomas School in Leipzig. In 1876, he moved to Marburg University as Extraordinary Professor of Theoretical Physics, and in 1880 was invited to fill a similar post at the University of Strasbourg. He was made Professor of Physics at the Karlsruhe Institute of Technology in 1883, and was invited by the University of Tübingen in 1885. In 1895, he returned to Strasbourg as Principal of the Physics Institute.

In 1885, Braun married Amalie Buehler, with whom he had five children.

=== Radio work ===
In 1897, Braun joined the line of wireless pioneers. His major contributions to the development of radio were the introduction of a closed tuned circuit in the generating part of the transmitter, its separation from the radiating part (the antenna) by means of inductive coupling, and later on the usage of crystals for receiving purposes. Around 1898, he invented a crystal detector. Wireless telegraphy claimed his full attention in 1898, and for many years after that he applied himself almost exclusively to the task of solving its problems. He had written extensively on wireless subjects and was well known through his many contributions to The Electrician and other scientific journals. In 1899, he applied for the patent Wireless electro transmission of signals over surfaces. Also in 1899, he is said to have applied for a patent on Electro telegraphy by means of condensers and induction coils.

Pioneers working on wireless devices eventually came to a limit of distance they could cover; connecting the antenna directly to the spark gap produced only a heavily damped pulse train. There were only a few cycles before oscillations ceased. Braun's circuit afforded a much longer sustained oscillation because the energy encountered less losses swinging between coil and Leyden jars. And by means of inductive antenna coupling the radiator was better matched to the generator. The resultant stronger and less bandwidth consuming signals bridged a much longer distance.

In 1905, Braun invented the phased array antenna; he described in his Nobel Prize lecture how he carefully arranged three antennas to transmit a directional signal. This invention led to the development of radar, smart antennas, and MIMO.

Braun's British patent on tuning was used by Guglielmo Marconi in many of his tuning patents. Marconi used Braun's patents (among others). Marconi would later admit to Braun himself that he had "borrowed" portions of Braun's work. In 1909, Braun and Marconi were jointly awarded the Nobel Prize in Physics "in recognition of their contributions to the development of wireless telegraphy"; the prize awarded to Braun depicts this design. He experimented initially at the University of Strassburg, not long before he bridged a distance of 42 km to Mutzig. In spring 1899, Braun, accompanied by his colleagues Cantor and Zenneck, went to Cuxhaven to continue their experiments at the North Sea. On 24 September 1900, radio telegraphy signals were exchanged regularly with the island of Heligoland over a distance of 62 km. Light vessels in the river Elbe and a coast station at Cuxhaven commenced a regular radio telegraph service.

=== Later life and death ===
In 1914, Braun went to New York in the United States to be a witness for the defense in a lawsuit regarding a patent claim by the Marconi Company against Telefunken's wireless station in Sayville. He was a Lutheran.

After the U.S. declared war on Germany in 1917, Braun was detained as an enemy alien. He was allowed to move freely within Brooklyn, where he died of a heart attack the following year on 20 April at the age of 67.

== Inventions and discoveries ==
=== Semiconductor ===
In 1874, Braun discovered the asymmetric conduction properties of certain materials, which became the foundation for the point-contact rectifier. This discovery showed that certain metal-semiconductor junctions could conduct electricity more easily in one direction than the other, a crucial property for diodes.

Braun's work with semiconductors led to the development of the first point-contact diode, often credited as a basic semiconductor device that allowed the rectification of alternating current into direct current. This is important because it was one of the first real-world applications of semiconducting materials, paving the way for future semiconductor devices that would later evolve into modern diodes, transistors, and other semiconductor technology.

Braun's discoveries were instrumental in the early development of electronics and helped lay the groundwork for the semiconductor industry we know today.

=== Cathode-ray tube ===
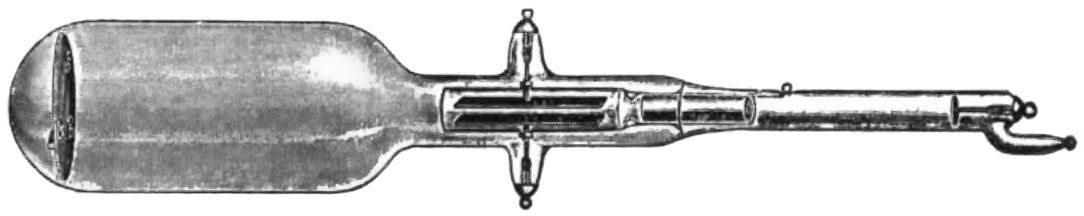
Braun's original cathode-ray tube, 1897

Braun's enduring fame is largely due to his invention of the cathode-ray tube (CRT), which is still commonly referred to as the "Braun tube"; today, the term typically refers to a high-vacuum tube, in which an electron beam can be deflected in both horizontal and vertical directions. The first version, developed in Strassburg in 1897, was far from perfect; it featured a cold cathode and a moderate vacuum, which required a 100,000 V acceleration voltage to produce a visible trace of the magnetically deflected beam. Furthermore, magnetic deflection affected only one direction, while the other was controlled by a rotating mirror placed in front of the phosphorescent screen.

However, industry immediately recognized the potential of the invention, leading to its further development. By 1899, his assistant, Jonathan Zenneck, introduced oscillations to magnetically control the Y deflection, and later improvements included the addition of a heated cathode, a Wehnelt cylinder, and high-vacuum technology. This tube was not only used for oscilloscopes, but also for fully electronic television transmission as a picture tube for television sets, although Braun had considered it unsuitable for television.

The CRT became the cornerstone in developing fully electronic television, being a part of every TV, computer, and any other screen setup till the introduction of the LCD screen at the end of the 20th century. It is still occasionally called the "Braun tube" in German-speaking countries (Braunsche Röhre) and other countries such as Korea (브라운관: Buraun-kwan) and Japan (ブラウン管: Buraun-kan).

=== Radio receiver ===
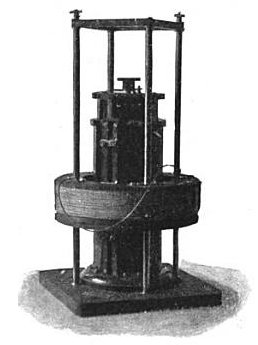
An early resonant transformer invented by Braun used in the coherer radio receivers in wireless telegraphy radio systems made by the Telefunken company in 1903

Following the invention of his tube, Braun began researching in the field of wireless telegraphy. A key issue in early radio technology was the development of a reliable receiver. Braun, as a physicist, was accustomed to working under reproducible experimental conditions, which the commonly used coherer receivers at the time failed to meet. He replaced the coherer with a crystal detector, which greatly improved the sensitivity of the receiver, although the crystal detector required frequent re-adjustment. It was only later that the electron tube replaced the crystal detector, although devices like germanium diodes continued to be used in simpler receivers for some time. The first FM radar systems still employed a crystal detector.

In late 1898, the technology was commercialized when the chocolate manufacturer from Cologne, Ludwig Stollwerck, founded a consortium to exploit Braun's patents, contributing 560,000 marks in capital. After the successful transmission of signals over longer distances, the consortium was transformed into the "Professor Braun's Telegraphy Company," which eventually became Telefunken AG. They set up the first world-wide network of communications, and was the first in the world to sell electronic televisions with cathode-ray tubes in Germany in 1934. In 1900, Stollwerck facilitated contact with Professor August Raps, head of the Siemens & Halske Telegraph Construction Company, which later took over the development of the apparatus.

See more: Crystal detector

=== Radio transmitter ===
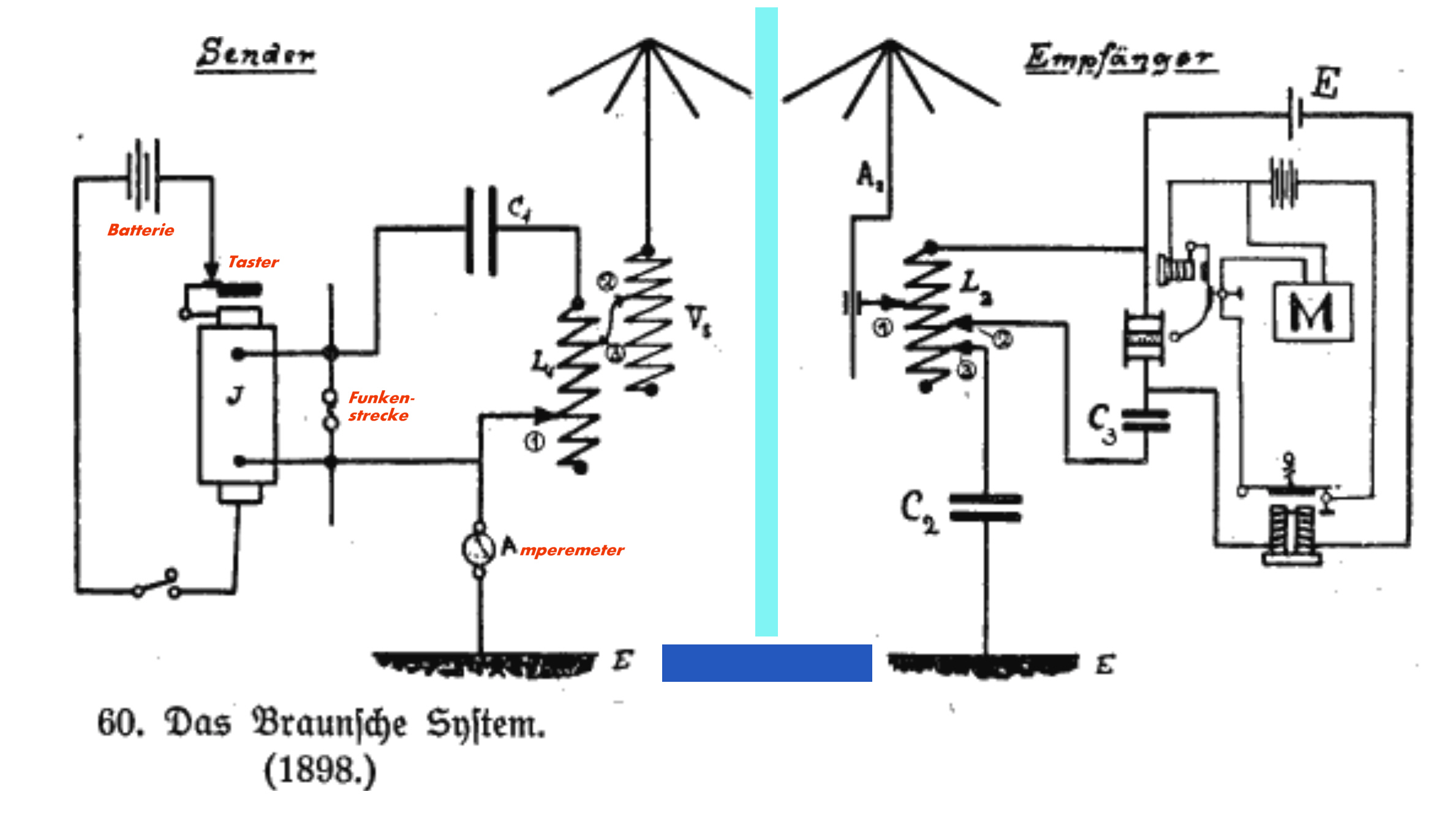
Braun's two circuits to send and receive

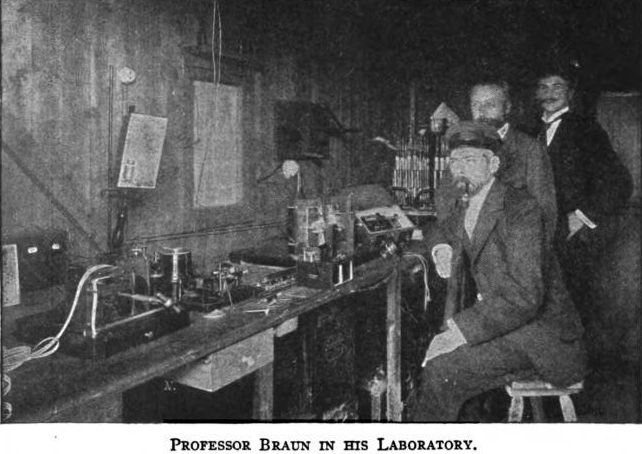
Braun in his laboratory, 1904

Braun also made significant contributions to radio transmission technology. While Guglielmo Marconi had developed his transmitter primarily through empirical methods, Braun was able to improve it by focusing on the underlying physics. Originally, the resonant and antenna circuits were combined, but he separated them into two parts: a primary circuit consisting of a capacitor and spark gap, and an antenna circuit inductively coupled to it. This innovation allowed for greater energy transmission in the system.

By 1898, the resulting powerful systems made the term "long-distance telegraphy" more appropriate, as the maximum range, previously limited to 20 km, steadily increased. On 24 September 1900, a radio link was successfully established between Cuxhaven and Helgoland over a distance of 62 km. On 12 December 1901, Marconi received radio signals at his station in Poldhu, Cornwall, at Signal Hill in St. Johns, Newfoundland, using a transmitter designed in Braun's circuit. Whether this reception actually occurred remains debated in the literature.

Meanwhile, Braun attempted to replace the spark-gap transmitter, which produced damped oscillations, with AC generators that generated undamped oscillations, though he was unable to implement a feedback loop using electron tubes at the time.

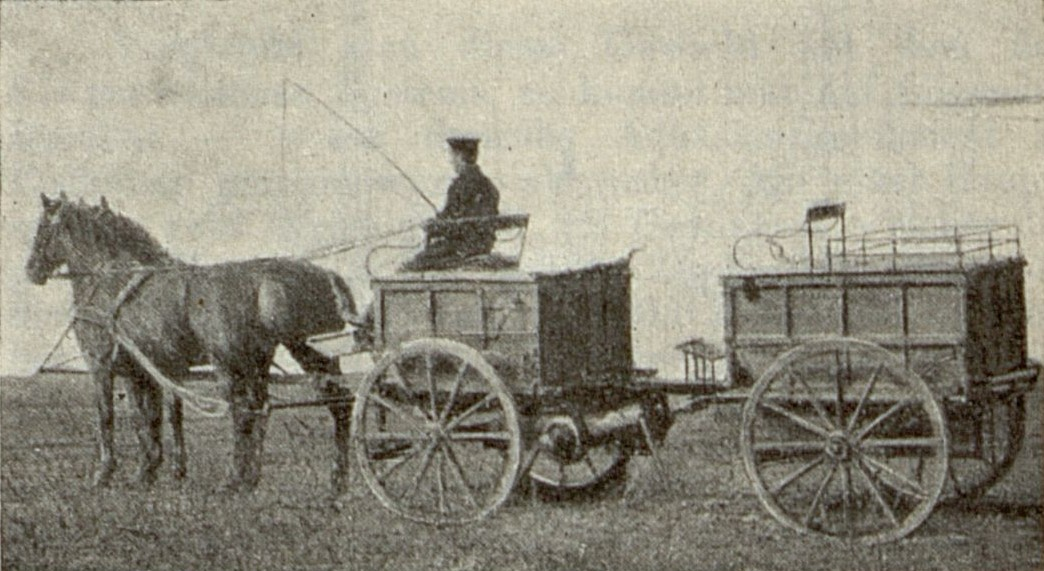
A Braun mobile station, 1903

Together with Georg Graf von Arco and Adolf Slaby, Braun was part of the team that developed the concept for "mobile stations for wireless telegraphy for military purposes," which in 1903 led to a practical implementation by AEG and Siemens & Halske. The system consisted of two horse-drawn wagons: one with all the transmitting and receiving equipment, including a battery, and the other with auxiliary and reserve supplies. This allowed the wagons to be separated in difficult terrain, as the station could still operate with just the front wagon.

See more: Wireless telegraphy

=== Antennas ===
Braun also focused on early problems in directional radio—the alignment of transmitting and receiving antennas. He was among the first to achieve directed radiation and optimized antenna performance through calculations.

=== Electroscope ===
Braun is also credited with the invention of the pointer electroscope, which was named after him.

== Awards ==
Year	Organization	Award	Co-recipients	Citation	Ref.
1909	Royal Swedish Academy of Sciences	Nobel Prize in Physics	Guglielmo Marconi	"In recognition of their contributions to the development of wireless telegraphy."	

== Commemoration ==
In 1987, the Society for Information Display created the Karl Ferdinand Braun Prize, awarded for an outstanding technical achievement in display technology.

== Patents ==
- U.S. Patent 0,750,429, Wireless Electric Transmission of Signals Over Surfaces
- U.S. Patent 0,763,345, Means for Tuning and Adjusting Electric Circuits

== See also ==
- History of radio
- Invention of radio
- Edouard Branly
