= Adolf Slaby =

German electronics pioneer (1849–1913)

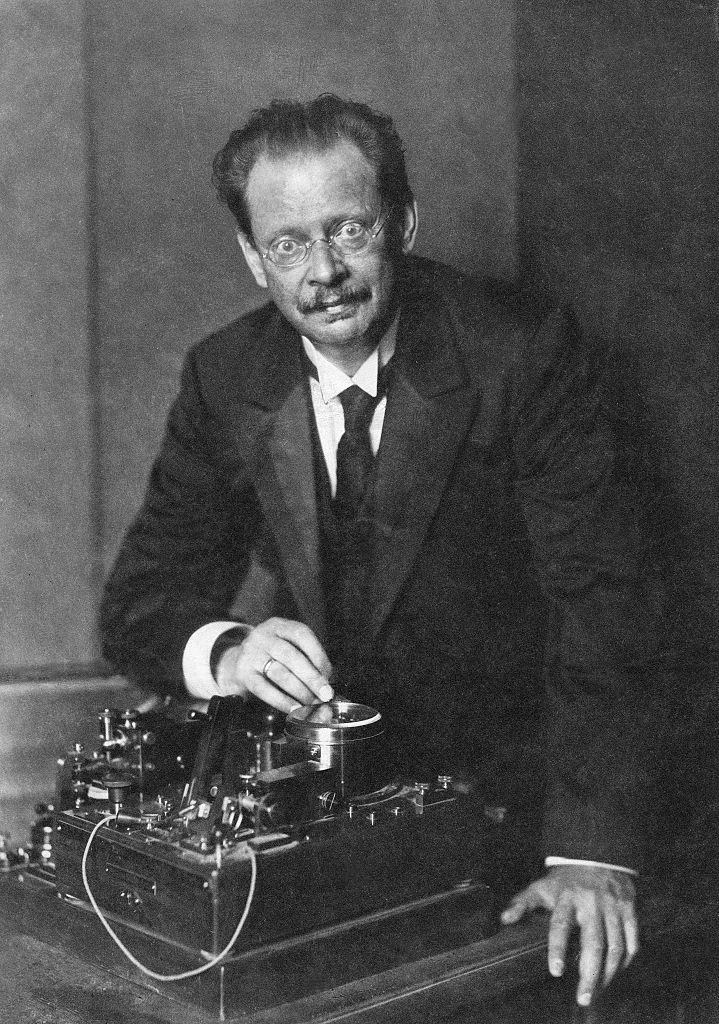
Adolf Slaby by Nicola Perscheid

Adolf Karl Heinrich Slaby (18 April 1849 – 6 April 1913) was a German electronics pioneer and the first Professor of electro-technology at Technische Hochschule Charlottenburg (today Technische Universität Berlin, 1886).

== Education ==
Slaby was born in Berlin, the son of a bookbinder. He studied at Berliner Gewerbeakademie, the predecessor of Technische Hochschule Charlottenburg to study mechanical engineering and mathematics under Franz Reuleaux. He was employed as a housekeeper with the machine manufacturer Louis Schwartzkopff, leading to an interest in mechanical engineering. Slaby continued his studies at the University of Jena, and received his doctorate in mathematics.

== Early research ==
Slaby taught mathematics and mechanics at a vocational school at Potsdam, where he conducted experiments on steam engines and petrol engines. He wrote his book Theorie der Gasmaschinen (Theory of Gas Engines), which had an important part in the development of Internal combustion engines. Slaby also studied with Heinrich Hertz.

== Electro-technology ==
Berlin was at that time the center of electro-technology, with Werner von Siemens in a leading position. Siemens supported Slaby personally in his private studies. Slaby performed his Habilitation at the Berliner Gewerbeakademie in 1876, and lectured on electrical motors, electrical telegraphy, and Electromechanics. In 1883, he became a tenured professor of electro-technology.

In the meantime, Technische Hochschule Charlottenburg had been renamed Technische Hochschule Berlin. Here, Slaby developed a program of theoretical lectures connected with practical work. With the generous support of an industry he established in 1884 which was an electro-technical laboratory, making Berlin the most important training center for the recently developed field of electrical technology.

== Radio ==
As a result of his personal friendship with the head of English telegraph administration, Sir William Henry Preece (1834–1917), Slaby participated with the help of his assistant Georg Graf von Arco from 1897 in Marconi's experiments with wireless telegraphy across the English Channel. He recognized immediately the meaning of this invention, and repeated the experiments in Berlin, leading to the development of essential kinetic and technical concepts. The Emperor and the military authorities were very interested by the result.

The wireless telegraphy – trials took place first at TH Berlin, and then between Church of the Redeemer, Sacrow and the marine station Kongsnaes in Potsdam. On 7 October 1897, he established a 21-kilometer radio link between Schöneberg and Rangsdorf, a world record at the time. The following summer, he established a link between Berlin to Jüterbog with the end-points being over 60 km apart. Crucial improvements led to the success, not of spark gap transmission antennas as used by Marconi, but inductive antennas.

== Development of Telefunken ==
Radio communications were also transmitted at several places, by Slaby at the AEG, by Marconi Wireless telegraph Co. and by Ferdinand Braun at Siemens & Halske. However Slaby's radiograms were rejected by Marconi station, because the licensing had forbidden this action. This untenable condition led to consolidation: in 1903 AEG and Siemens & Halske formed the "Gesellschaft für drahtlose Telegrafen m. b. H. System Telefunken", known as Telefunken.

== Engagement for the Hochschule ==
Slaby became both chairman of Verein Deutscher Ingenieure and in 1893 the first chairmen of VDE, and a personal audience with William II, German Emperor. Slaby gave lectures about technology in the Berlin Palace, and organized experimental lectures for the emperor at TH Berlin. This accomplished the social recognition of engineers and the complete equal rights of the Technische Hochschulen (institutes of technology) with the universities. Adolf Slaby became the first representative in 1898 of a TH to be a lifetime member in Prussian Herrenhaus. In 1906, Slaby retired to emeritus status. His successor was Ernst Orlich, a representative of the classical mathematical treatment of the problems of the theoretical electro-technology. Slaby was then named chairman of the board for the Akademischer Verein Hütte (Association of Students) a position he held until 18 January 1912.

== Memorials ==
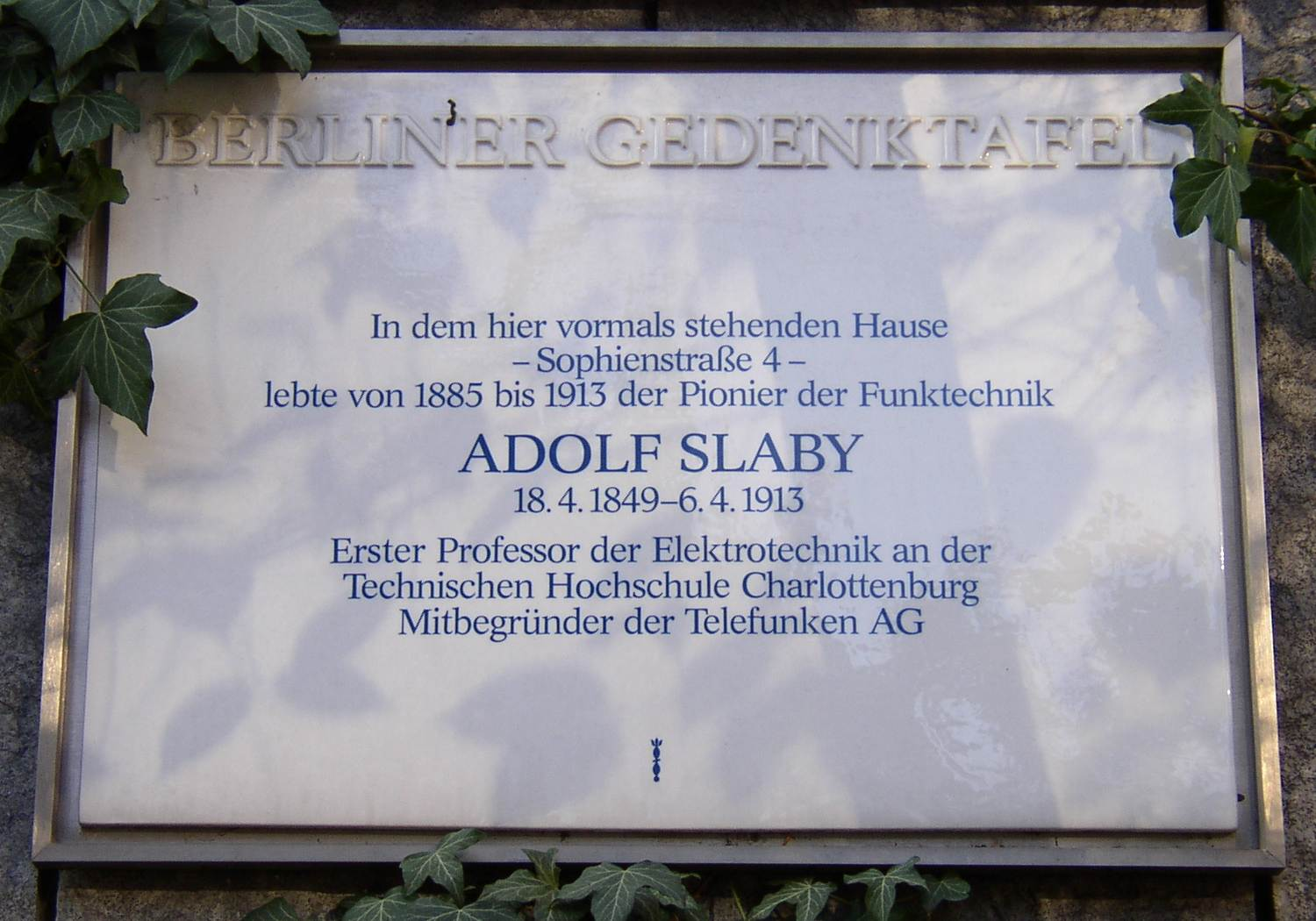
Berlin memorial plaque in Charlottenburg (road of the 17. June 1952)

- There is a Berlin memorial plaque dedicated to him at Technische Universität Berlin, with the following inscription, "BERLINER GEDENKTAFEL in dem hier vormals stehenden Hause – Sophienstraße 4 – lebte von 1885 bis 1913 der Pionier der Funktechnik ADOLF SLABY18.4.1849 – 6.4.1913 Erster Professor der Elektrotechnik an der Technischen Hochschule Charlottenburg Mitbegründer der Telefunken AG" (Here lived from 1885 to 1913 Adolf Slaby18.4.1849 – 6 April 1913, the pioneer of radio engineering, first professor of electro-technology at the Technischen Hochschule Charlottenburg, joint founder of Telefunken AG)
- The memory of Slaby was published on a stamp in his memory, at the Federal Post Office Berlin (first day of issue was on his 125th Birthday on 14 April 1974).
- In two districts of Berlin (Treptow Köpenick and Marzahn Hellersdorf) there are roads named after Adolf Slaby.

== Publications ==
- Slaby, Adolphus, "The New Telegraphy, Recent experiments in telegraphy with sparks.". The Century Magazine. April 1898. Pages 867–874.
