= Grosch =

Grosch may refer to:

- Christian Heinrich Grosch (1801-1865), Norwegian architect
- Constantin Grosch (born 1992), German politician
- Herb Grosch (1918–2010), Canadian-American computer scientist
  - Grosch's law, an observation about computer performance
- Mária Grosch (born 1954), Hungarian chess player
- Mathieu Grosch (born 1950), Belgian politician
- Mike Leon Grosch (born 1976), German singer

== See also ==
- Groschen, a coin
- Grolsch, similar name
