= Telefunken =

German radio and television apparatus company

Telefunken GmbH
- Logo since 1919
- Industry: Electrical industry
- Founded: 1903; 123 years ago
- Founder: Siemens & Halske and AEG
- Defunct: 1967; 59 years ago merger with parent company AEG to AEG-Telefunken
- Headquarters: Berlin, Germany
- Parent: AEG (1941-1967)
- Website: telefunken.com

Telefunken was a German radio and television manufacturer, founded in Berlin in 1903 as a joint venture between Siemens & Halske and the Allgemeine Elektrizitäts-Gesellschaft (AEG) ("General electricity company"). Prior to World War I, the company set up the first world-wide network of communications and was the first in the world to sell electronic televisions with cathode-ray tubes, in Germany in 1934 and were influential in building studio microphones. In 1941, Siemens sold its 50% stake to AEG making Telefunken a wholly-owned subsidiary. The two formally merged into a single AEG-Telefunken in 1967, and collapsed in 1982 after which its consumer radio and television arm was sold to Thomson and its military and aviation arm acquired by Daimler-Benz with some of its subsidiaries continuing on with the name.

Since 2004, the trademark rights to Telefunken belong to TELEFUNKEN Licenses GmbH (owned since 2023 by Gordon Brothers) who have licensed the brand to other companies for use on products. Most notably these are Telefunken televisions and white goods made by Turkish Vestel (since 2008), consumer audio and e-mobility made by Karcher AG (Note: Not to be confused with Kärcher) and premium studio audio equipment made by American Telefunken Elektroakustik.

== Brand names ==
The brand had several incarnations:

- Gesellschaft für drahtlose Telegraphie m.b.H., System Telefunken, founded in 1903 as a joint venture between AEG and Siemens & Halske
- Telefunken, Gesellschaft für drahtlose Telegraphie m.b.H., in 1923; since 1941 as subsidiary of AEG alone
- Telefunken GmbH, in 1955
- Telefunken Aktiengesellschaft (AG), in 1963
- Allgemeine Elektrizitäts-Gesellschaft AEG-Telefunken, created in 1967 through a merger between Telefunken and AEG
- AEG-TELEFUNKEN AG, in 1979

The company also had several subsidiaries and spin-offs of its own:

- TELEFUNKEN Fernseh und Rundfunk GmbH, formed in 1972 in Hanover as a subsidiary of AEG-TELEFUNKEN
- Telefunken electronic GmbH, a spin-off of AEG-Telefunken and DASA
- TEMIC TELEFUNKEN microelectronic GmbH, since 1992
- Telefunken Semiconductors GmbH & Co. KG, formed in Heilbronn in 2009
- Telefunken Lighting technologies S.L., since 2009

== History ==
=== 1900s-1930s ===
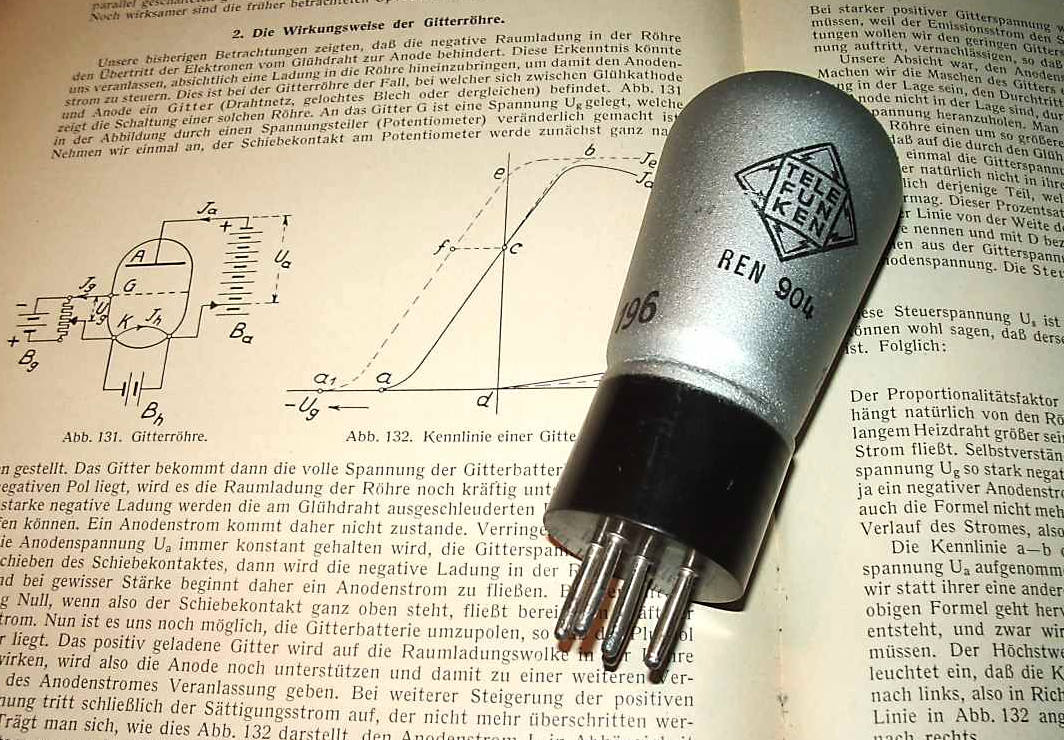
Telefunken REN 904. A vacuum tube from 1930, used in early German radios.

Around the start of the 20th century, two groups of German researchers worked on the development of techniques for wireless communication. The one group at AEG, led by Adolf Slaby and Georg Graf von Arco, developed systems for the Kaiserliche Marine; the other one, under Karl Ferdinand Braun, at Siemens, for the German Army. Their main competitor was the British Marconi Company.

When a dispute concerning patents arose between the two companies, Kaiser Wilhelm II urged both parties to join efforts, creating Gesellschaft für drahtlose Telegraphie System Telefunken ("The Company for Wireless Telegraphy Ltd.") joint venture on 27 May 1903, with the disputed patents and techniques invested in it. On 17 April 1923, it was renamed Telefunken, The Company for Wireless Telegraphy. Telefunken was the company's telegraphic address. The first technical director of Telefunken was Count Georg von Arco.

Telefunken rapidly became a major player in the radio and electronics fields, both civilian and military. Prior to World War I the company set up the first world wide network of communications and during the war they supplied radio sets and telegraphy equipment for the military, as well as building one of the first radio navigation systems for the Zeppelin force. The Telefunken Kompass Sender operated from 1908 to 1918, allowing the Zeppelins to navigate throughout the North Sea area in any weather.

In 1911, Telefunken built a wireless station in West Sayville just north of the Long Island Rail Road tracks. A 500-foot tower that could be raised and lowered rose from a ball and socket joint atop a concrete foundation. It was completed in 1912 and wireless messages could then be transmitted to a similar tower in Nauen 3,500 miles away. From August 1, 1914, until April 6, 1917, the United States monitored messages sent over the Telefunken wireless and the United States Marine Corps guarded the station. After the U.S. declared war the station was sealed off, the wire fence surrounding it was charged with electricity, and floodlights were placed throughout. After World War I it was taken over by Mackay Radio and Telegraph Company and later the Federal Aviation Administration. It was demolished in 1938.

Starting in 1923, Telefunken built broadcast transmitters and radio sets. In 1928, Telefunken made history by designing the V-41 amplifier for the German Radio Network. This was the very first two-stage, "Hi-Fi" amplifier. Over time, Telefunken perfected their designs and in 1950 the V-72 amplifier was developed. The TAB (a manufacturing subcontractor to Telefunken) V-72 soon became popular with other radio stations and recording facilities. The V-72S was the only type of amplifier found in the REDD.37 console used by the Beatles at Abbey Road Studios on many of their early recordings.

In 1932, record players were added to the product line.

=== 1940s-1970s ===
In 1941, Siemens transferred its Telefunken shares to AEG as part of the agreements known as the "Telefunken settlement", and AEG thus became the sole owner and continued to lead Telefunken as a subsidiary (starting in 1955 as "Telefunken GmbH" and from 1963 as "Telefunken AG").

During the Second World War, Telefunken was a supplier of vacuum tubes, transmitters and radio relay systems, and developed Funkmess facilities (later referred to as radar devices by the US Navy) and directional finders, as part of the German air defence against aerial bombing. During the war, manufacturing plants were shifted to and developed in west of Germany or relocated. Thus, Telefunken, under AEG, turned into the smaller subsidiary, with the three divisions realigning and data processing technology, elements as well as broadcast, television and phono. Telefunken was also the originator of the FM radio broadcast system. Telefunken, through the subsidiary company Teldec (a joint venture with Decca Records), was for many decades one of the largest German record companies, until Teldec was sold to WEA in 1988.

In 1959, Telefunken established a modern semiconductor works in Heilbronn, where in April 1960 production began. The works was expanded several times, and in 1970 a new 6-storey building was built at the northern edge of the area. At the beginning of the 1970s it housed approximately 2,500 employees.

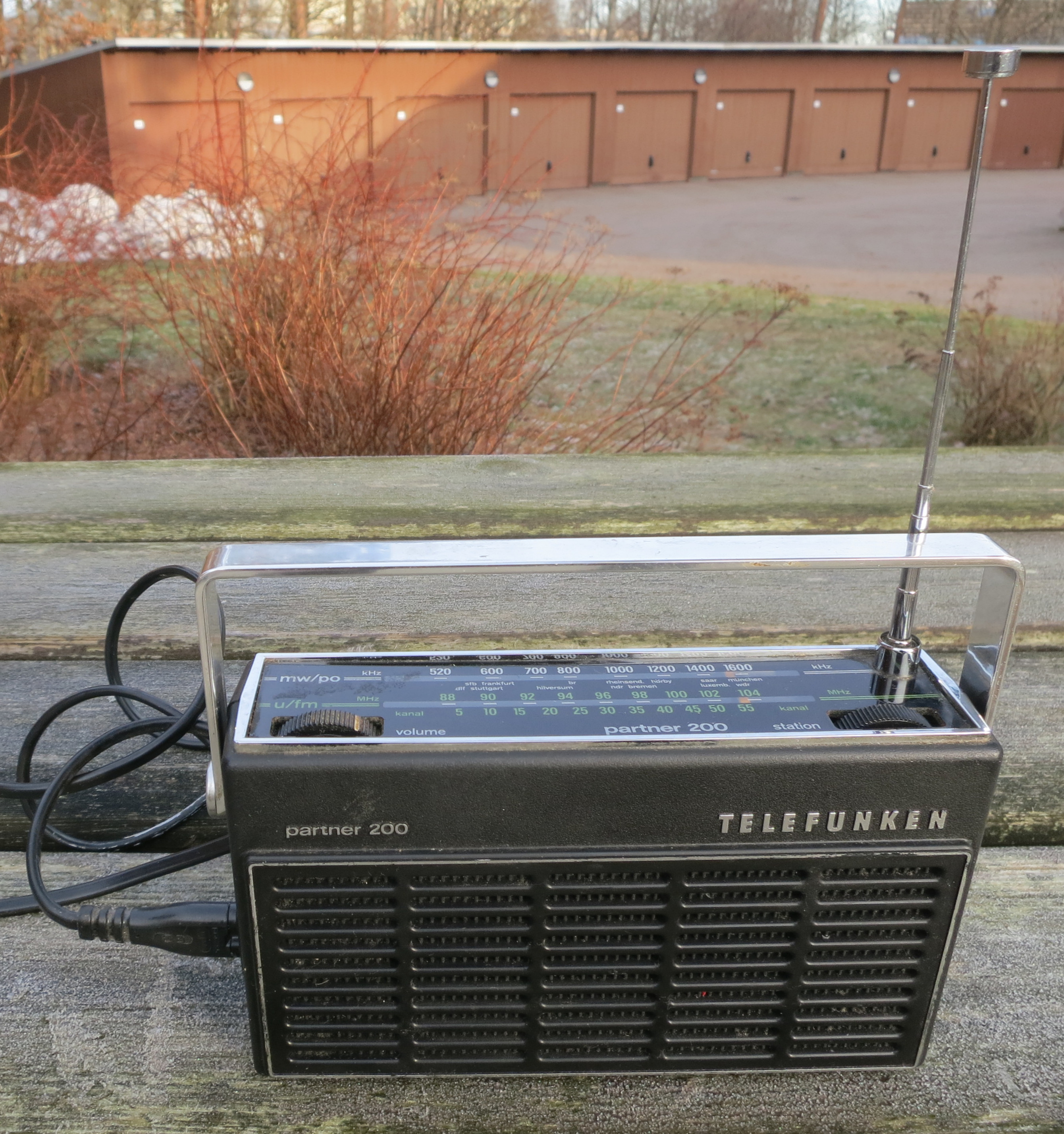
Telefunken Partner 200, radio receiver model produced 1976-1978 in West Germany.

In 1967, Telefunken was merged with AEG, which was then renamed AEG-Telefunken. In the beginning of the 1960s, Walter Bruch developed the PAL-colour television system for the company, in use by most countries of the western Hemisphere (except the United States, Canada, Mexico, and the western part of South America). PAL is established i.e. in the United Kingdom (PAL-I) and, except France, many other European countries -–also in Brazil (PAL-M), Argentina (PAL-N), South Africa, India and Australia.

The mainframe computer TR 4 was developed at Telefunken in Backnang, and the TR 440 model was developed at Telefunken in Konstanz, including the first ball-based mouse named Rollkugel in 1968. The computers were in use at many German university computing centres from the 1970s to around 1985. The development and manufacture of large computers was separated in 1974 to the Konstanz Computer Company (CGK). The production of mini- and process computers was integrated into the automatic control engineering division of AEG.

=== 1980s and later ===
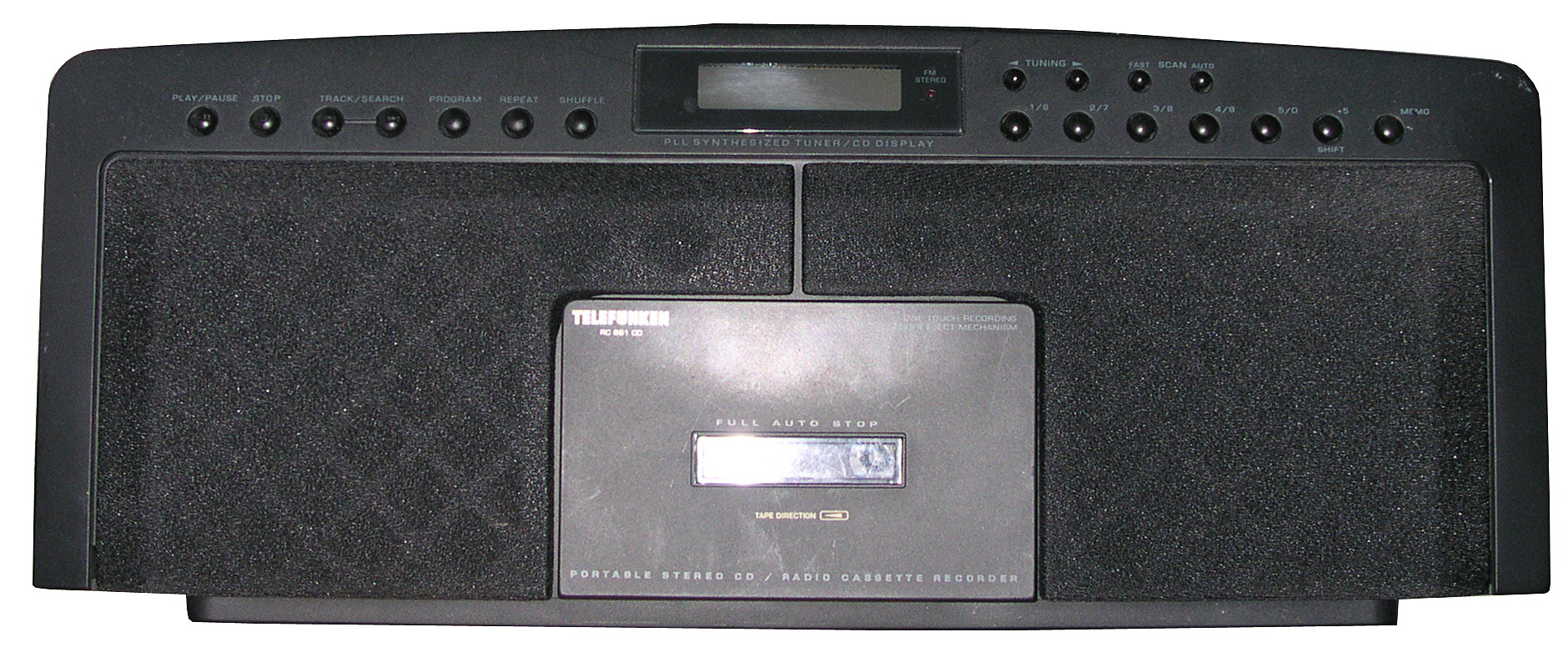
A Telefunken RC 881 cassette, CD player, and radio

In the 1970s and early 1980s, Telefunken was also instrumental in the development of high quality audio noise reduction systems, including telcom c4 (marketed since 1975), High Com (marketed since 1978), High Com II, High Com III, High Com FM, and CX (1982).

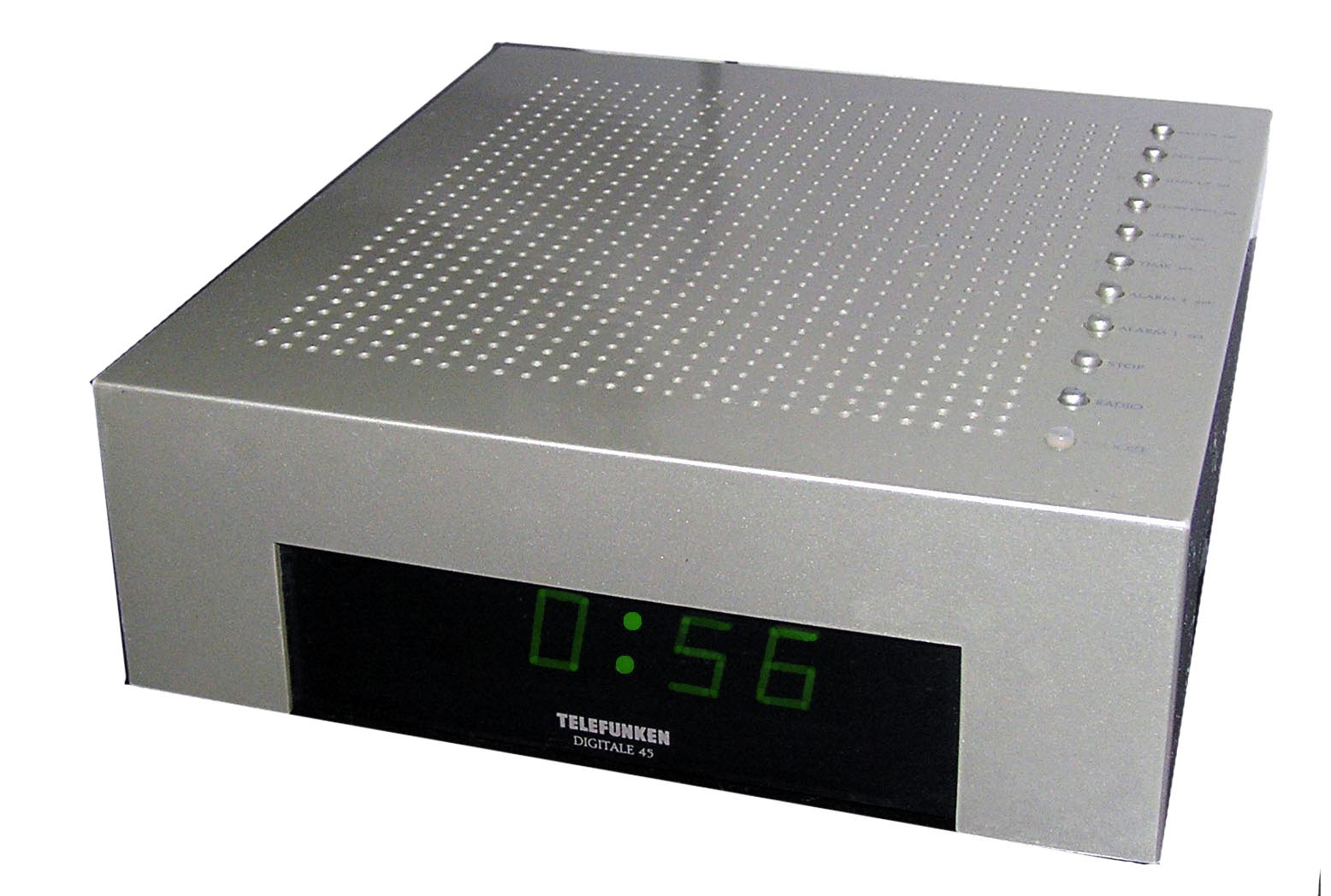
Telefunken alarm clock from c. 1995 made by Thomson SA, designed by Philippe Starck

AEG-Telefunken became bankrupt in 1982. The French Thomson bought its consumer electronics division in 1983 and continued to make and market Telefunken products. The remainings of AEG-Telefunken was bought by Daimler-Benz in 1985, and "Telefunken" was dropped from the new company name which became just AEG AG but certain subsidiaries continued having that name.

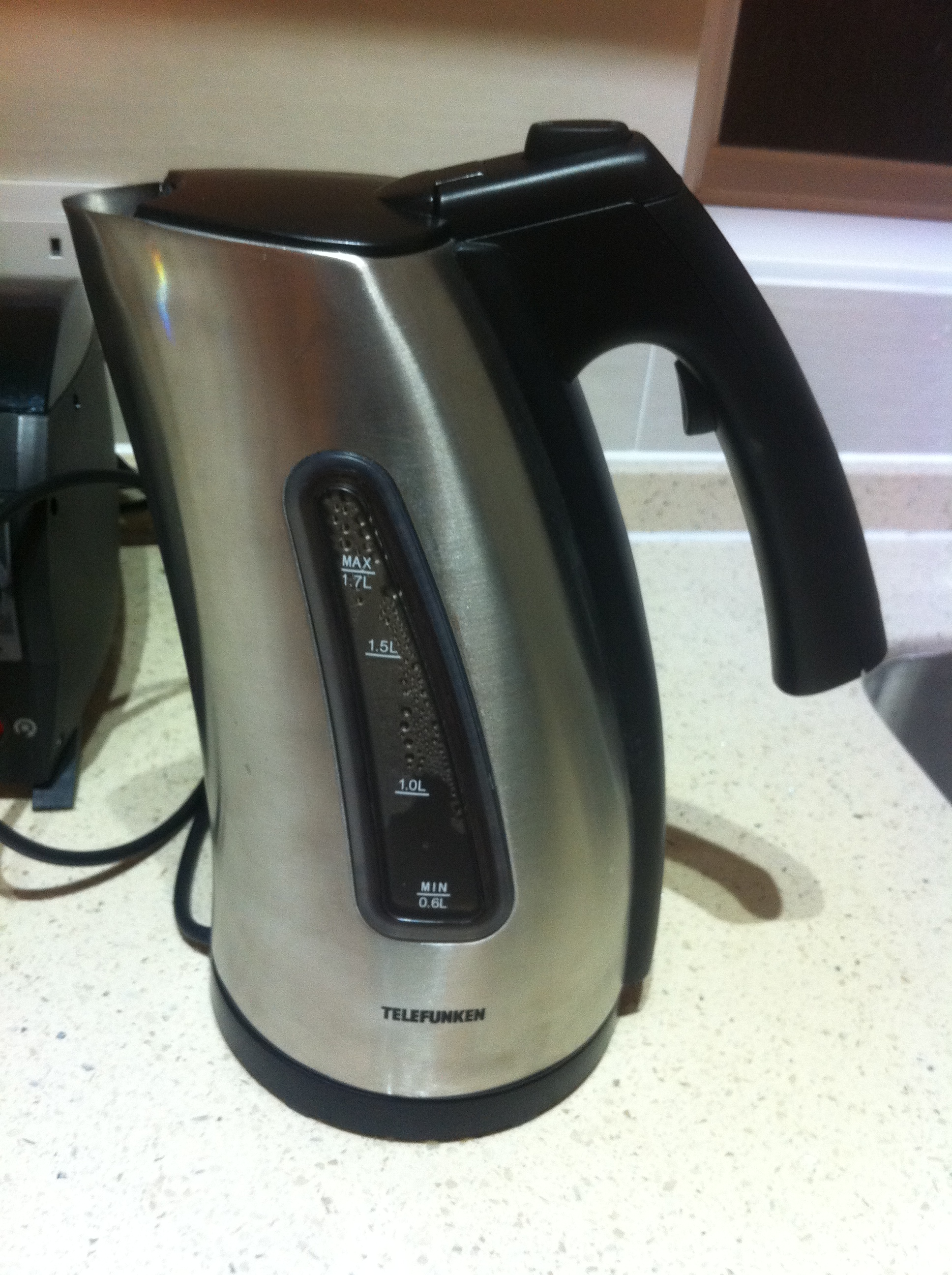
Telefunken electric kettle from 2011, made by Vestel

In 1995, Telefunken Sendertechnik GmbH, the heavy industrial infrastructure subsidiary of AEG that built high-power commercial broadcast transmitters, was sold to Tech Sym Corporation (owners of Continental Electronics Corporation of Dallas) for $9 million. However, it remained a German company based in Berlin. In 2005, this company changed its name to Transradio SenderSysteme Berlin AG. The name "Transradio" dates back to 1918, when Transradio was founded as a subsidiary of Telefunken and a year later made history by introducing duplex transmission. In August 2006, Transradio was acquired by the Turkish company Profilo Telra, one of the largest manufacturers of televisions in Europe, with brand-owner Telefunken Licenses GmbH granting a license for the trademark rights to let Profilo release new Telefunken television sets. In 2008, the licensed trademark rights were granted to Turkish company Vestel.

Another part of the original Telefunken, Telefunken Racoms, involved in military radio, remained part of Daimler-Benz until it was spun off in 2000 as EADS Racoms, only to be purposefully renamed back to Telefunken Racoms a few years later. It was still based in Ulm and kept this name until 2020 when it was renamed by its owner, Elbit Systems.

Meanwhile, South Windsor, Connecticut based Telefunken Elektroakustik (Telefunken USA) was founded in 2001 as a modern revival of the original Telefunken. The company has held the exclusive rights for professional studio audio equipment. They also provide restoration services and build reproductions of vintage Telefunken microphones.

In 2023, the Telefunken brand was acquired by the advisory and investment firm Gordon Brothers.

== Business fields ==
The old Telefunken company had produced an extensive product spectrum of devices and systems from 1903 to 1996. Common characteristics are the authority for high frequency and communications technology and the construction unit and infrastructure technology necessary for it. Among other things:

- Energy-saving lighting technology
- Analogue computers
- Voucher recognition, pattern recognition and letter sorting
- Data communications networks
- Digital computer for exchange technique, air traffic control, scientific, military applications
- Electrical elements
- Electro-acoustic plants and studio equipment
- Flight guidance systems
- Guidance and weapon deployment systems
- Radio and data communication for applications of military
- Radios for authority and operating radio
- Semiconductors, circuits, solar cells, infrared modules
- Mobile radio engineering
- Direction finder and detection
- Phono and tape decks, videodisc
- Power tools
- Radar facilities for soil, flight and ship monitoring
- Radio and TV home receivers
- Vacuum tubes
- Radio relay link and satellite technology
- Records
- Sending and receipt tubes, travelling field tubes, color image tubes
- Transmitters for broadcast and television, DAB transmitters
- Speech recognition
- Telephone, long-distance traffic, cable technology.

== Locations and manufacturing plants ==
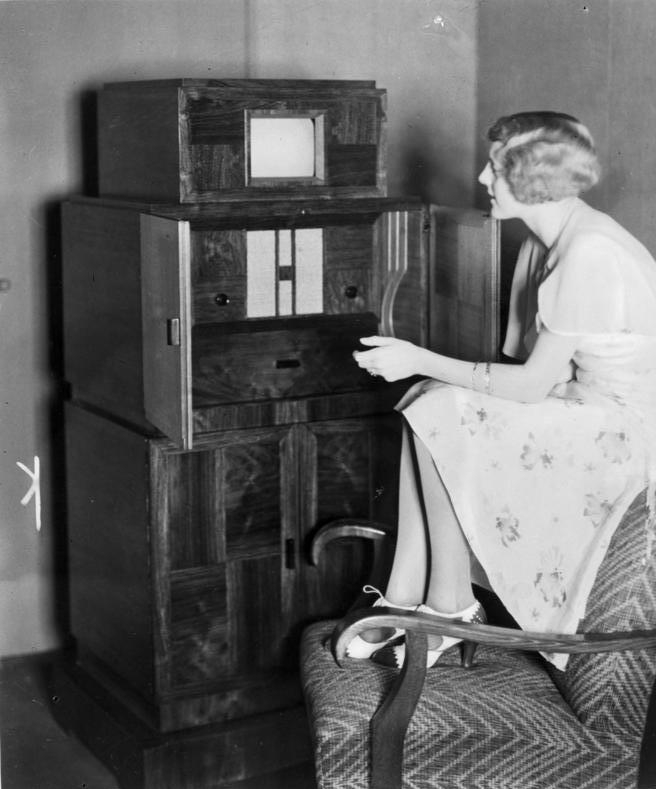
FE I – Telefunken's first Television set using CRT (c. 1932)

Into the 1930s years, production was made after a distributor in the workshops of the two parent companies. The company headquarters was located in Berlin Kreuzberg, Hallesches Ufer 30 (1918–1937).

The first commercially made electronic television sets with cathode-ray tubes were manufactured by Telefunken in Berlin in 1932.

Starting from 1938, manufacturing and developing plants were concentrated at the new headquarters (until 1945) in Berlin Zehlendorf, Goerzallee.

During the Second World War, there were further manufacturing plants in the Berlin area, in Thuringia, Saxony, Moravia, Silesia, on Rügen. In addition, in Baltic countries at Tallinn and Riga, and in occupied areas of Poland at Kraków and Łódź, floats and works were established. The vacuum tube factory Łódź was shifted with the staff in August 1944 to Ulm (Fortress Wilhelmsburg).

After the Second World War, new firm locations for development and production were established. The company headquarters was located first in Berlin-Schöneberg (1945–1948), then in Berlin-Kreuzberg (1948–1952), Berlin-Moabit (1952–1960) and Berlin Charlottenburg (1960–1967).

Production plants were located in:

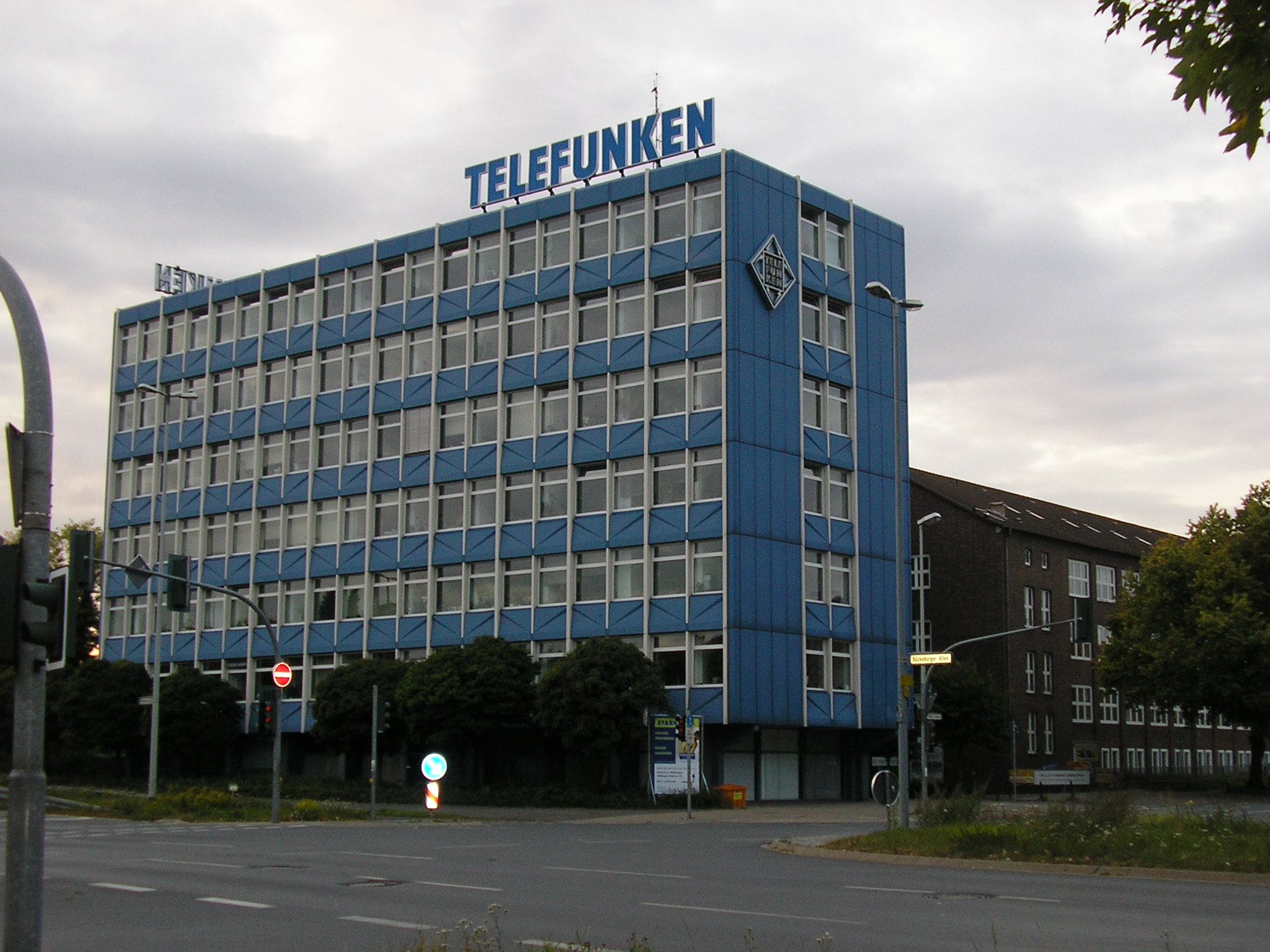
Hanover, Göttinger Chaussee 76: Administration building (1959/1960) of the former Telefunken Fernseh und Rundfunk GmbH (under Cultural heritage management), right next former Huth Apparatefabrik (1940/1941)

- Backnang: Long-distance communications and cable technology (now Tesat-Spacecom)
- Berlin-Moabit, Sickingenstr. 20–26: Broadcast and television transmitters, mobile communications (since 2005 Transradio SenderSysteme Berlin AG, later simply known as Transradio)
- Berlin-Moabit, Sickingenstr. 71: Tubes (since 2005: JobCenter Berlin Mitte, employment agency)
- Berlin-Wedding (current: Gesundbrunnen), Schwedenstr.: Broadcast sets, phono and tape decks, videocassette recorders, Videodisc players
- Celle: Color television sets (1966–1997), buildings completely demolished 2001/2002
- Eiweiler: High-frequency engineering
- Hanover, Göttinger Chaussee 76: Broadcast and television sets, acoustic engineering (until 1973)
- Heilbronn: Semiconductors, circuits, solar cells, infrared modules (1998–2008 Atmel; since 2009 Telefunken Semiconductors GmbH & Co. KG (subsidiary of Tejas Silicon Holdings, UK; Insolvency of Telefunken Semiconductors in April 2013)
- Konstanz: Computer technology, letter sorting systems, character recognition technology, air traffic control systems, studio tape decks, cash dispensing machines
- Offenburg: Long-distance communications technologies
- Osterode am Harz (former Kuba-Imperial plant): Videocassette recorder
- Ulm, Danube valley: Television picture tubes
- Ulm, Elisabethenstrasse: Radar, radiolocation, detection equipment, speech and radio data transmission systems, Research Centre (2000: EADS Racoms – Radio Communication Systems; then Cassidian, part of EADS Defence & Security, today Airbus Defence and Space, today Elbit Systems)
- Ulm, Söflinger Strasse: Tubes
- Wolfenbüttel: Electroacoustics (from 1973 on)

== See also ==
- Transistron (Duodiode) - parallel discovery of the bipolar transistor by Herbert F. Mataré and Heinrich Welker in 1948/1949
