= Adolf Eybel =

German painter

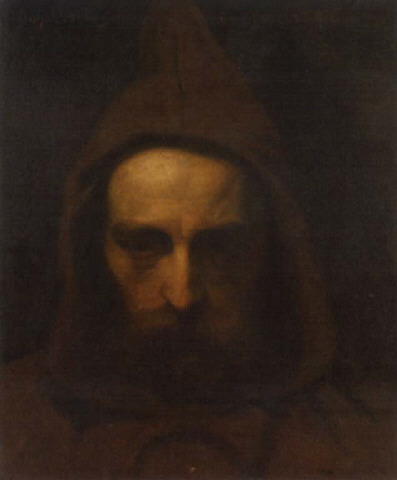
Portrait of a man dressed as a monk

Adolf Eybel (28 February 1808 – 12 October 1882) was a German painter of historical and genre subjects and of portraits. He was born in Berlin. He studied at the Berlin Academy, and under Professor Kolbe, as well as in Paris under Delaroche. One of his most noted pictures represents Richard Coeur-de-Lion with his court listening to Blondel's Song. He died in Berlin in 1882. The following works by him may also be mentioned:

- A Gleaner.
- The Battle of Fehrbellin.
- Scene from Sir Walter Scott's Woodstock.
- Scene from Faust.
- A Wine Party.

== See also ==
- List of German painters
