= Georg von Arco =

German physicist (1869–1940)

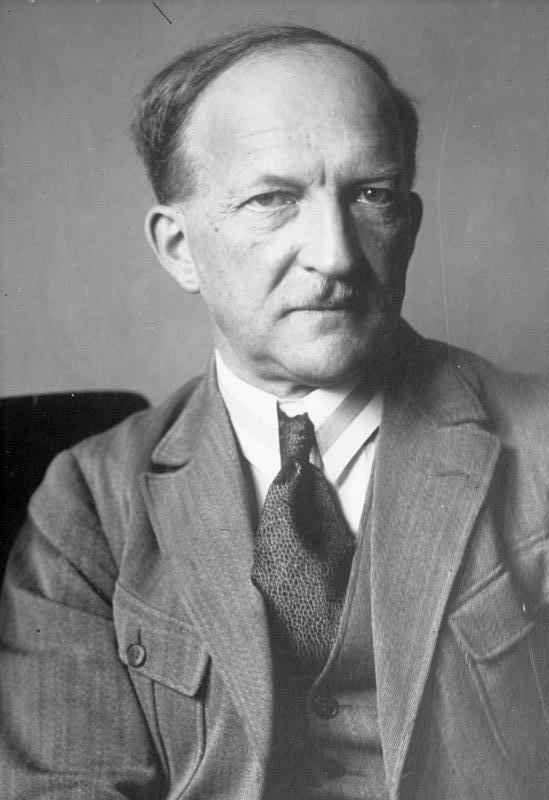
- Born: Georg Wilhelm Alexander Hans Graf von Arco; 30 August 1869; Großgorschütz, Kingdom of Prussia
- Died: 5 May 1940 (aged 70); Berlin, Nazi Germany
- Education: Technische Universität Berlin
- Scientific career
- Fields: Physicist

Georg Wilhelm Alexander Hans Graf von Arco (30 August 1869 in Großgorschütz – 5 May 1940 in Berlin) was a German physicist, radio pioneer, and one of the joint founders of the "Society for Wireless Telegraphy" which became the Telefunken company. He was an engineer and the technical director of Telefunken. He was crucial in the development of wireless technology in Europe.

Arco served for a time as an assistant to Adolf Slaby, who was close to William II, German Emperor. Until 1930, Arco was one of the two managing directors of the company. He participated in the development of high performance tube transmitters. Together with his teacher, Slaby, he was considerably involved in the study and development of high-frequency engineering in Germany. He was a Monist and a pacifist. Between 1921 and 1922, he was a chairman of the German Monist Federation.

== Early years ==
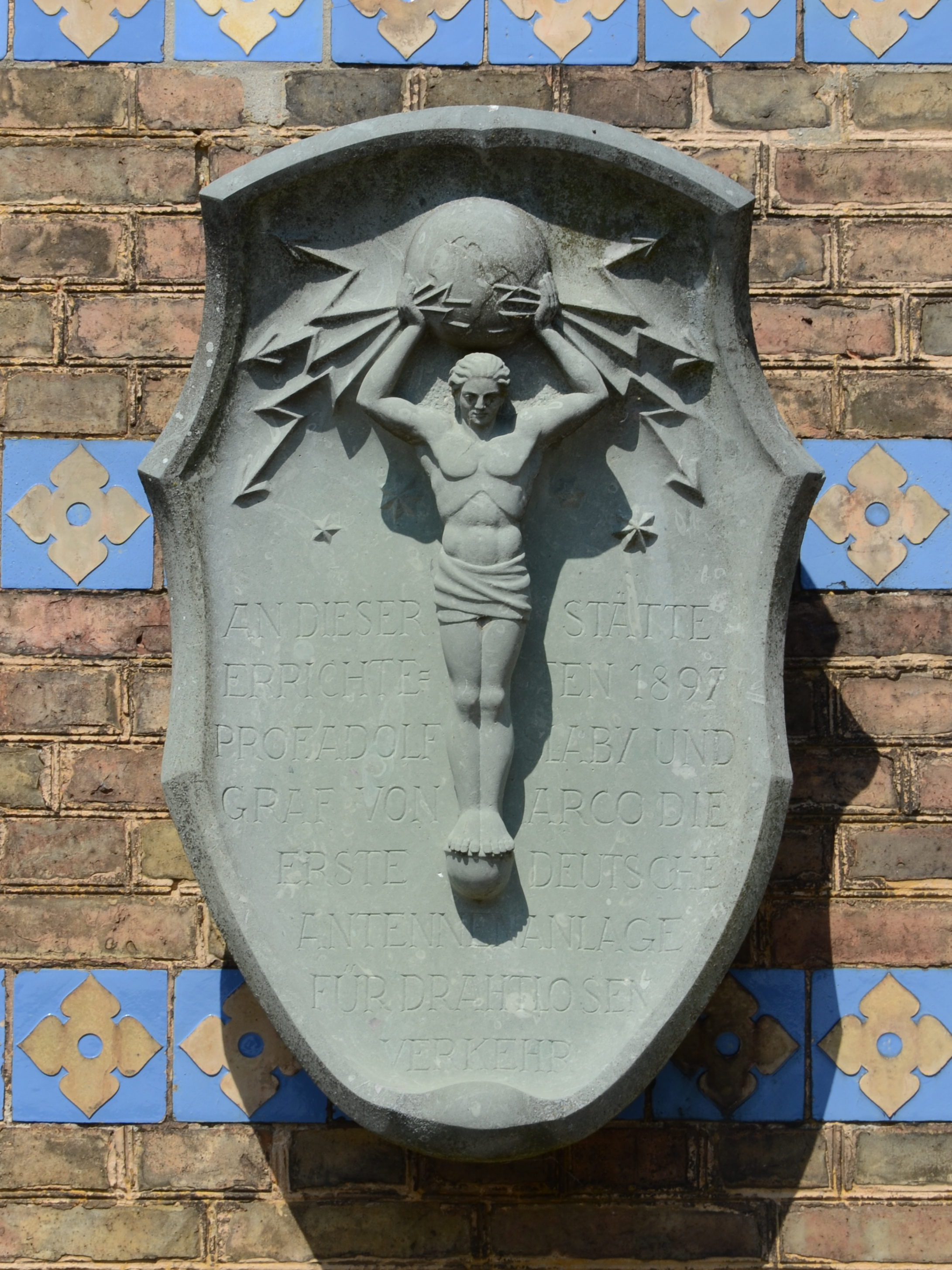
Plaque commemorating the first radio transmission in Germany, on the Church of the Redeemer in Sacrow/Potsdam.

Arco was born on the estate of his father, Count Alexander Karl von Arco, in Großgorschütz, Upper Silesia, Prussia (now Gorzyce, Poland). He belonged to the Arco family, of Italian origin. His noble title was abolished when Germany became a republic after the First World War. As a child he was interested in machines of all kinds, but after graduating from the Maria Magdalenen High School in Breslau (now Wrocław, Poland) in 1889, he did not study engineering sciences, but instead attended mathematical and physical lectures at the University of Berlin. Afterwards he took up a military career, a family tradition. After three years with the military, however, he left to study mechanical engineering and electro-technology at the Technissche Hochschule in Charlottenburg (today Technische Universität Berlin), from 1893. There he became acquainted with Professor Adolf Slaby, who had participated in Guglielmo Marconi's transmission experiments on the coast of the English Channel.

Building on these attempts, Arco and Slaby in the summer of 1897 used the free-standing bell tower of the Church of the Redeemer, Potsdam, as an antenna, to verify and understand Marconi's experiments. Here the first German antenna system for wireless telegraphy was established. On 27 August a radio transmission to the German naval base "Kongsnaes," 1.6 kilometers away, was successful.

In 1928 a plaque was fixed over the door of the bell tower of the Church of the Redeemer to commemorate to this feat. In the centre of the plaque, which is made from green dolomite, is Atlas with the globe, surrounded by lightning and the text: "At this place in 1897 Professor Adolf Slaby and Count von Arco erected the first German antenna system for wireless communication".

On 7 October 1897, the first radio link from Schöneberg to Rangsdorf in Berlin was successful, and the following summer Jüterbog, about 65 km (40 mi) southwest of Berlin, could be reached.

== AEG ==
In 1898, at the end of his studies, Arco went to work as an engineer at the Kabelwerk Oberspree plant of AEG. At first Arco was responsible as a laboratory engineer for testing various electrical cable types, but also, through continued contact with Slaby, introduced and developed wireless telegraphy at AEG.

== Telefunken ==
Patent disputes between Siemens and AEG resulted in both companies, at the behest of William II, German Emperor, founding a common enterprise, the Society for Wireless Telegraphy Ltd. The company's telegraphic address, Telefunken, eventually became the company name. Arco greatly increased the power and range of early transmitters. In this regard he surpassed the Löschfunkensender of Max Wien, which had already exhibited a substantially better efficiency than the Knallfunkensender of Ferdinand Braun, and in addition could send on a narrow frequency band.

== Nauen radio station ==
Arco's greatest service lay in the development of the large radio station at Nauen, 20 miles west of Berlin, thereby helping Telefunken to become a firm of worldwide reputation. In 1909 he equipped it with a Löschfunksender, a quenched-spark transmitter, and Nauen changed from being a research station into a station with regular radio traffic. Now contact could be made with the African colonies and naval vessels at sea. A decade later, in 1918, the transmitting power had increased tenfold. The station used a new transmitter technology introduced in 1912, a high frequency alternator (similar to an Alexanderson alternator) with magnetic frequency multiplier converter. This permitted the production of undamped continuous waves with high power. This development was due to the substantial involvement of Arco. It stimulated electron tube experiments.

== Philosophical and ideological activities ==
While Slaby continued working in the university, Arco pursued philosophical activities. He associated himself with the Monist movement and the Berlin Circle for Empirical Philosophy, as well as the pacifist movement during the First World War as a founding member and chairman of the Bund Neues Vaterland. He belonged to the German Monist League, whose chairman he was from 1921 to 1922. In 1923 he was joint founder of the Society of Friends of New Russia, because of which he celebrated his 60th birthday in Moscow, which was unusual for someone in his position.

He was an advisory member of the Abraham Lincoln Foundation, a German branch of the Rockefeller Foundation.

== Death and afterwards ==
After his death, Arco was accorded the honour of a civic funeral by Berlin. The tended grave is at the Stahnsdorf South-Western Cemetery, a large cemetery southwest of Berlin. The Berlin Senate had a memorial plaque erected at Albrechtstrasse 49/50 in the Mariendorf area of Tempelhof. In Charlottenburg, Havelstrasse was renamed Arcostrasse in 1950, in memory of this pioneer of radio engineering. Also in Nauen, where Telefunken has had a working transmission station since the beginning of the 20th century, there is another road named after him.

The town of Arco, Idaho, was named after him in 1903. In 1955 this small town in eastern Idaho became the first community in the world ever to be lit by electricity generated by nuclear power.

== External reading ==
- Margot Fuchs: Georg von Arco (1869–1940): Ingenieur, Pazifist, Technischer Direktor von Telefunken. Diepholz/Berlin: GNT Verlag, 2004, ISBN 978-3-928186-70-4.

== External articles ==
- GrafvonArco-schule.de, Graf von Arco
- Rolaa.de
- MaerkischeAllgemeine.de, Arco, Georg Graf von (Südwestkirchhof Stahnsdorf), Märkische Allgemeine, newspaper for Bundesland Brandenburg.
- Google.com, Literature by and about George von Arco in the catalog of the German National Library.
