= Constantin Grosch =

German politician (born 1992)

Member of the Landtag of Lower Saxony
- Incumbent
- Assumed office 8 November 2022

Personal details
- Born: 26 August 1992 (age 33)
- Party: Social Democratic Party (since 2015)
- Other political affiliations: Pirate Party (formerly)

Constantin Grosch (born 26 August 1992) is a German politician serving as a member of the Landtag of Lower Saxony since 2022. He has been a member of the Kreistag of Hameln-Pyrmont since 2011, and has served as group leader of the Social Democratic Party in the Kreistag since 2019.
