= Camille Tissot =

French physicist (1868–1917)

Camille Papin Tissot
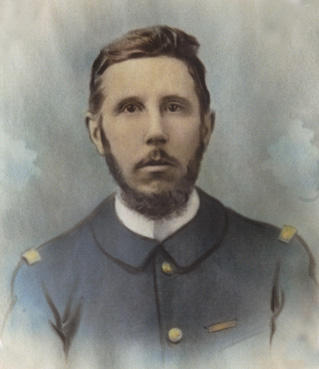
- Born: 15 October 1868; Brest, France
- Died: 2 October 1917 (aged 48); Arcachon, France

Camille Papin Tissot (English: /tiːˈsoʊ/, French: [kamij tiso]; 15 October 1868 – 2 October 1917) was a French naval officer and pioneer of wireless telegraphy who established the first French operational radio connections at sea.

== Life ==
Camille Papin Tissot was the second child of Pierre Tissot and Adeline Alexandrine Gérardin, born on 15 October 1868. Their third child, Esther Adèle Tissot, was born on 1 April 1872. The two surviving children, Camille and Esther, were primarily raised by their mother, as their father was often at sea.

Recommended by his father, Camille Tissot entered the naval college at Brest in 1884 when he was 16 years old. He studied navigation on the school ship Le Borda until 1886, and was then posted to the port of Brest. In the first years of his career in the navy, he was successively posted to various school ships and warships, finally to the cruiser "Coetlogon". He then turned to shore duty as of 23 January 1891. He agreed to temporarily occupy one of the teaching positions in physics and chemistry of the naval school. He stayed on for 21 years as a professor in École Navale. The passion of sciences having been transmitted to him by his father, he obtained the degree of Bachelor of the Physical sciences. It was as a professor in École Navale that he became devoted to the study of the electric oscillations and their application in the maritime field.

Tissot acquired ranks during his various assignments:

- 1 August 1886: Aspirant of second class
- 5 October 1887: Aspirant of first class
- 5 October 1889: Enseigne de vaisseau
- 22 August 1896: Lieutenant de vaisseau
- 19 April 1912: Capitaine de frégate

This last promotion was exceptional for a sailor who practically never sailed. It was due to the importance of the work undertaken by Tissot for the Navy.

In 1894, Camille Tissot met and married Jeanne Emma Stapfer, a 20-year-old woman of an Alsacienne family who moved to Brest in 1870. He nominally converted to the Catholic religion at the request of his father-in-law, although his own beliefs were socialist and atheist. Among the guests at his wedding were Albert Turpain and Marcel Cachin, very committed members of Parliament and future founder of French Communist Party in 1920. They had one daughter, Camille.

== Work ==
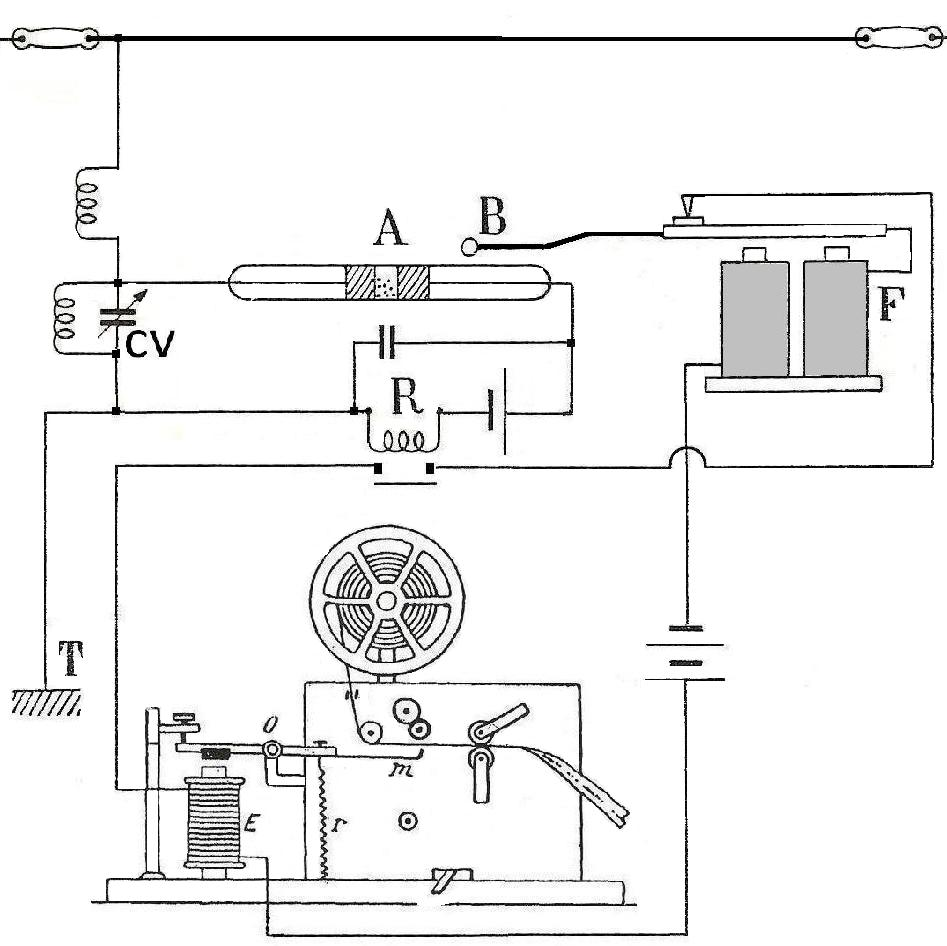
In 1902 Tissot used a coherer receiver of this type at the lighthouse at Ushant, communicating over a range of 80 kilometers.

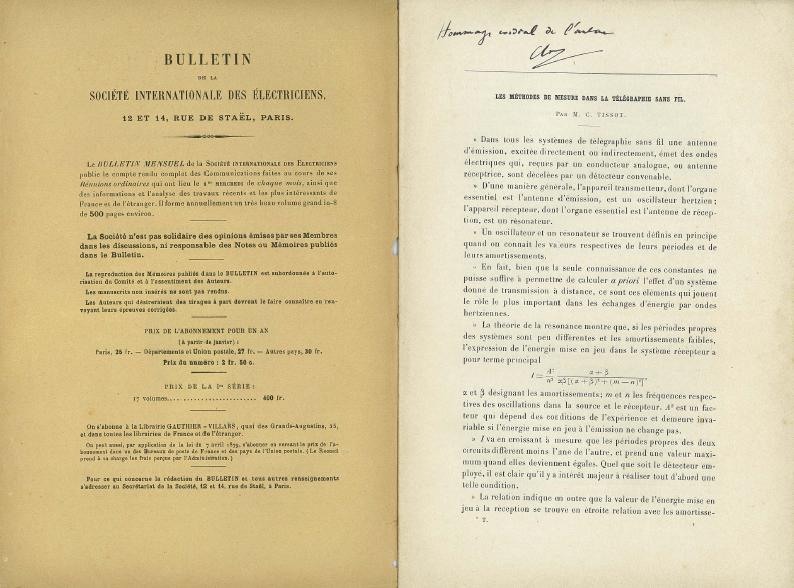
Article by Camille Tissot, published in the n° 57 of July 1906 of the bulletin of the "Company of the Electricians" (Société des électriciens).

In 1896, when the work of Lodge and of Marconi concerning wireless telegraphy was still little known, Tissot undertook parallel and independent research. He built apparatus for radio experiments with the assistance of E. Branly and of the manufacturer Eugene Ducretet for whom later he will develop apparatus.

On 3 August 1898, Tissot demonstrates the first French operational radio connection at sea, covering 800 meters between "BORDERED" and an on-shore semaphore station. Convinced, the Minister of Marine on 6 August agrees to finance purchase of material to allow him to continue his tests. With this apparatus Camille Tissot in 1899 organized a large trial run and demonstrates communications by radio, initially between various points of the roads of Brest and the Saint Martin church, then to the islands Vierge (Plouguerneau) and Stiff (Ushant).

In 1898 he also established radio contact to the island of Ouessant. This station will become Ushant radio station, with call sign FFU ( French Fixe of Ushant), which is active there until 1943.

In 1899, Tissot published a report describing his work and experiments through the roads of Brest. In 1900, Tissot equipped the French Navy with its first radio apparatus.

In 1902, the station Ushant TSF is established with a radio operator, receiver with coherer, and an arc transmitter. This station had a radio telegraphy range of 80 kilometers with a fleet of 14 ships at sea and with Brest.

In 1904 the Ouessant radio station with call sign FFU carried out radiotelegraphic connections on 600 meters with a fleet of passenger ships.

From 1905, Tissot made very thorough studies on the detection of radio signals. Following these tests, Tissot showed the possibility of using radio to transmit a time signal and to regulate the chronometers of the ships at sea. The Bureau des Longitudes started daily time signal service starting in May 1910.

In 1907, Tissot conceived, with F Pellin, a Crystal radio without tiresome adjustment to receive signals aboard ships.

In 1911, his technical expertise was required by a committee of French industrialists carried out by E Girardeau, during the series of lawsuits between the Marconi Company and French radio companies. With the occasion of these lawsuits, Tissot and Férrié in particular sought to show certain faults of patent 77777 of Marconi, but also the priority of experiments of certain French scientists, like Eugene Ducretet. Marconi won the lawsuit, but the decision of the court, which gave the Marconi the right to replace the French material by material made by Marconi, will never be applied in France.

During the First World War, Tissot made several stays at Bizerte, to equip ships with radio and to work on detection of underwater sound.

Commander Tissot died in October 1917 of pulmonary tuberculosis and influenza. He was buried in the military square of the cemetery of Arcachon. He was an Officer of the Legion of Honor, and Officer of the State education.

== Publications ==
Résonance of the antenna

He wrote three detailed works:

- (in French) Mémoire de thèse de Doctorat sur la résonance des antennes (1905). Doctoral thesis on antenna resonance
- (in French) Traité sur les oscillations électriques (1906) Treatise on electric oscillations
- (in French) Manuel de TSF théorique et pratique (1912), Handbook of theoretical and practical TSF (1912), republished until 1932 (6th edition).
- (in French) books written by Camille Tissot.

He was also the author of many articles of popularization of radio in international scientific reviews, and gave very many conferences on the subject. Although not a member, he intervened regularly in front of the Académie des Sciences. He received several prizes and rewards of the Academy.

== See also ==
- Crystal radio
- 500 kHz
- Coherer
- Édouard Branly
- Cat's whisker detector
- Electrolytic detector
- Foster–Seeley discriminator
- Grid-leak detector
- Hot wire barretter
- Magnetic detector
- Plate detector
- Wunderlich detector
