= Detector (radio) =

Device which extracts info from a modulated radio frequency current or voltage

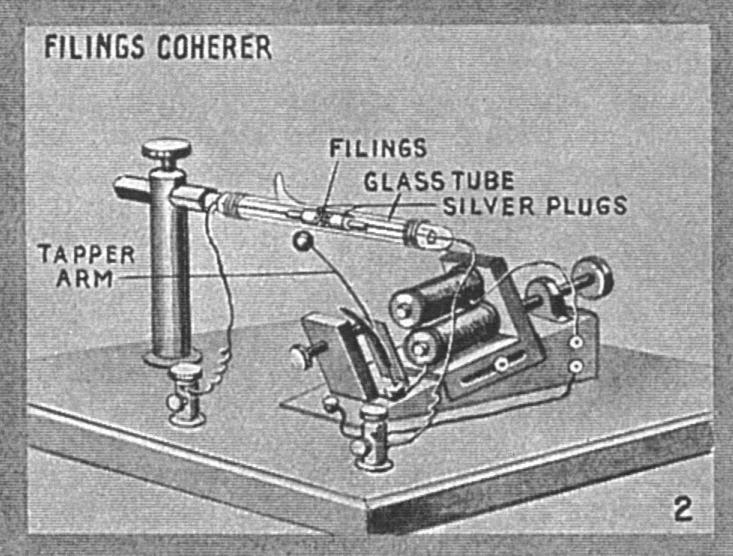
A coherer detector, useful only for Morse code signals.

In radio, a detector is a device or circuit that extracts information from a modulated radio frequency current or voltage. The term dates from the first three decades of radio (1888–1918). Unlike modern radio stations which transmit sound (an audio signal) on an uninterrupted carrier wave, early radio stations transmitted information by radiotelegraphy. The transmitter was switched on and off to produce long or short periods of radio waves, spelling out text messages in Morse code. Therefore, early radio receivers in order to receive the message, merely had to detect the presence or absence of the radio wave, allowing the receiver to make a sound during the Morse code "dots" and "dashes". The device that performed this function in the receiver circuit was called a detector. A variety of different detector devices, such as the coherer, electrolytic detector, magnetic detector and the crystal detector, were used during the wireless telegraphy era until superseded by vacuum tube technology.

After the invention of amplitude modulation (AM) enabled the development of AM radiotelephony, the transmission of sound (audio), during World War 1, the term evolved to mean a demodulator, (usually a vacuum tube) which extracted the audio signal from the radio frequency carrier wave. This is its current meaning, although modern detectors usually consist of semiconductor diodes, transistors, or integrated circuits.

In a superheterodyne receiver the term is also sometimes used to refer to the mixer, the tube or transistor which converts the incoming radio frequency signal to the intermediate frequency. The mixer is called the first detector, while the demodulator that extracts the audio signal from the intermediate frequency is called the second detector. In microwave and millimeter wave technology the terms detector and crystal detector refer to waveguide or coaxial transmission line components, used for power or SWR measurement, that typically incorporate point contact diodes or surface barrier Schottky diodes.

== Amplitude modulation detectors ==
=== Envelope detector ===
Simple diode detector. The AM input (green) is first rectified by the diode. The output voltage (red) ripples just below the upper envelope by charging and discharging the capacitor.

The envelope of a waveform is a curve that outlines the waveform. A major category of AM demodulation technique involves envelope detection, since the envelope of an AM signal is the original signal.

A diode detector is a type of simple envelope detector. It consists of a diode connected between the input and output of the circuit, with a resistor and capacitor in parallel from the output of the circuit to the ground to form a low-pass filter. Their RC time constant must be small enough to discharge the capacitor fast enough when the envelope is falling. Meanwhile, the filter's cutoff frequency should be well below the carrier wave's frequency to sufficiently attenuate the carrier.

A simple crystal radio with no tuned circuit can be used to listen to strong AM broadcast signals

An early form of envelope detector was the crystal detector, which was used in the crystal set radio receiver. A later version using a crystal diode is still used in crystal radio sets today. The limited frequency response of the headset eliminates the RF component, making the low-pass filter unnecessary.

More sophisticated envelope detectors include the grid-leak detector, the plate detector, the infinite-impedance detector, transistor equivalents of them and precision rectifiers using operational amplifiers.

=== Product detector ===
A product detector is a type of demodulator used for AM and SSB signals, where the original carrier signal is removed by multiplying the received signal with a signal at the carrier frequency (or near to it). Rather than converting the envelope of the signal into the decoded waveform by rectification as an envelope detector would, the product detector takes the product of the modulated signal and a local oscillator, hence the name. By heterodyning, the received signal is mixed (in some type of nonlinear device) with a signal from the local oscillator, to give sum and difference frequencies to the signals being mixed, just as a first mixer stage in a superhet would produce an intermediate frequency; the beat frequency in this case, the low frequency modulating signal is recovered and the unwanted high frequencies filtered out from the output of the product detector. Because the sidebands of an amplitude-modulated signal contain all the information in the carrier displaced from the center by a function of their frequency, a product detector simply mixes the sidebands down into the audible range so that the original audio may be heard.

Product detector circuits are essentially ring modulators or synchronous detectors and closely related to some phase-sensitive detector circuits. They can be implemented using something as simple as ring of diodes or a single dual-gate Field Effect Transistor to anything as sophisticated as an Integrated Circuit containing a Gilbert cell. Product detectors are typically preferred to envelope detectors by shortwave listeners and radio amateurs as they permit the reception of both AM and SSB signals. They may also demodulate CW transmissions if the beat frequency oscillator is tuned slightly above or below the carrier.

== Frequency and phase modulation detectors ==
AM detectors cannot demodulate FM and PM signals because both have a constant amplitude. However an AM radio may detect the sound of an FM broadcast by the phenomenon of slope detection which occurs when the radio is tuned slightly above or below the nominal broadcast frequency. Frequency variation on one sloping side of the radio tuning curve gives the amplified signal a corresponding local amplitude variation, to which the AM detector is sensitive. Slope detection gives inferior distortion and noise rejection compared to the following dedicated FM detectors that are normally used.

=== Phase detector ===
A phase detector is a nonlinear device whose output represents the phase difference between the two oscillating input signals. It has two inputs and one output: a reference signal is applied to one input and the phase or frequency modulated signal is applied to the other. The output is a signal that is proportional to the phase difference between the two inputs.

In phase demodulation the information is contained in the amount and rate of phase shift in the carrier wave.

=== The Foster–Seeley discriminator ===
The Foster–Seeley discriminator is a widely used FM detector. The detector consists of a special center-tapped transformer feeding two diodes in a full wave DC rectifier circuit. When the input transformer is tuned to the signal frequency, the output of the discriminator is zero. When there is no deviation of the carrier, both halves of the center tapped transformer are balanced. As the FM signal swings in frequency above and below the carrier frequency, the balance between the two halves of the center-tapped secondary is destroyed and there is an output voltage proportional to the frequency deviation.

=== Ratio detector ===
Circuit diagram and waveforms of a ratio detector using solid-state diodes

A ratio detector is a variant of the Foster–Seeley discriminator, but one diode conducts in an opposite direction, and using a tertiary winding in the preceding transformer. The output in this case is taken between the sum of the diode voltages and the center tap. The output across the diodes is connected to a large value capacitor, which eliminates AM noise in the ratio detector output. The ratio detector has the advantage over the Foster–Seeley discriminator that it will not respond to AM signals, thus potentially saving a limiter stage; however the output is only 50% of the output of a discriminator for the same input signal. The ratio detector has wider bandwidth but more distortion than the Foster–Seeley discriminator.

=== Quadrature detector ===
In quadrature detectors, the received FM signal is split into two signals. One of the two signals is passed through a high-reactance capacitor, which shifts the phase of that signal by 90 degrees. This phase-shifted signal is then applied to an LC circuit, which is resonant at the FM signal's unmodulated, "center," or "carrier" frequency. If the received FM signal's frequency equals the center frequency, then the two signals will have a 90-degree phase difference and they are said to be in "phase quadrature" — hence the name of this method. The two signals are then multiplied together in an analog or digital device, which serves as a phase detector; that is, a device whose output is proportional to the phase difference between two signals. In the case of an unmodulated FM signal, the phase detector's output is — after the output has been filtered; that is, averaged over time — constant; namely, zero. However, if the received FM signal has been modulated, then its frequency will vary from the center frequency. In this case, the resonant LC circuit will further shift the phase of the signal from the capacitor, so that the signal's total phase shift will be the sum of the 90 degrees imposed by the capacitor, and the positive or negative phase change imposed by the LC circuit. Now the output from the phase detector will differ from zero, and in this way, one recovers the original signal that was used to modulate the FM carrier.

=== XOR gate detector ===
The detection process described above can also be accomplished by combining, in an exclusive-OR (XOR) logic gate, the limited original FM signal and either a copy of that signal passed through a network which imposes a phase shift that varies with frequency, e.g. an LC circuit (and then limited as well), or a fixed-frequency square wave carrier at the center frequency of the signal. The XOR gate produces a stream of output pulses the duty cycle of which corresponds to the phase difference between the two signals. Due to the varying phase difference between the two inputs, a pulse-width modulated (PWM) signal is produced. When a low-pass filter is applied to those pulses, the filter's output rises as the pulses grow longer and its output falls as the pulses grow shorter. In this way, one recovers the original signal that was used to modulate the FM carrier.

When a phase-shifted version of the original signal is used, the result is a frequency demodulation, as the frequency difference between the inputs of the XOR gate remains zero and thus does not affect their phase relationship.

With a fixed-frequency carrier, the result is a phase demodulation, which, in this case is an integral of the original modulating signal.

=== Other FM detectors ===
Less common, specialized, or obsolescent types of detectors include:

- Travis or double tuned circuit discriminator using two non-interacting tuned circuits above and below the nominal center frequency
- Weiss discriminator which uses a single LC tuned circuit or crystal
- Pulse count discriminator which converts the frequency to a train of constant amplitude pulses, producing a voltage directly proportional to the frequency.

== Phase-locked loop detector ==
A phase-locked loop detector requires no frequency-selective LC network to accomplish demodulation. In this system, a voltage-controlled oscillator (VCO) is phase locked by a feedback loop, which forces the VCO to follow the frequency variations of the incoming FM signal. The low-frequency error voltage that forces the VCO's frequency to track the frequency of the modulated FM signal is the demodulated audio output. The phase-locked loop detector should not be confused with the phase-locked loop frequency synthesizer, which is often used in digitally-tuned AM and FM radios to generate the local oscillator frequency.

== See also ==
- Cat's whisker detector
- Coherer
- Demodulation
- Electrolytic detector
- Foster–Seeley discriminator
- Grid-leak detector
- Hot wire barretter
- Magnetic detector
- Plate detector
- Tikker
- Tuner (radio)
- Wunderlich detector
