= FFU =

FFU refer to:

- Fan filter unit
- Femur fibula ulna syndrome
- Final Fantasy: Unlimited, an anime television series
- Football Federation of Ukraine
- Fred Flintstone Units, a pejorative term used to refer to United States customary units
- Futaleufú Airfield, in Chile
- Le Conquet radio or FFU (French Française Fixe de Ushant), a French radio station
- Focus forming units, used to express Fluorescent Focus Assay in Virus quantification
