= Double-sideband suppressed-carrier transmission =

Transmission method used in amateur radio

Double-sideband suppressed-carrier transmission (DSB-SC) is transmission in which frequencies produced by amplitude modulation (AM) are symmetrically spaced above and below the carrier frequency and the carrier level is reduced to the lowest practical level, ideally being completely suppressed.

In DSB-SC, unlike simple AM, the wave carrier is not transmitted; thus, much of the power is distributed between the side bands, which implies an increase of arial coverage in DSB-SC, for the same power consumption.

DSB-SC transmission is a special case of Double-sideband reduced-carrier transmission. It is used for radio data systems. Single sideband suppressed-carrier mode is frequently used in amateur radio voice communications, especially on high-frequency bands.

== Efficiency and compatibility ==
DSB-SC is basically an amplitude modulation wave without the carrier, therefore reducing power waste, giving it a 50% efficiency. This is an increase compared to normal AM transmission (DSB) that has a maximum efficiency of 33.333%, since 2/3 of the power is in the carrier which conveys no useful information and both sidebands containing identical copies of the same information. Single sideband suppressed-carrier (SSB-SC) is 100% efficient.

Despite its efficiency advantages, a standard AM receiver (such as an envelope detector) is unable to receive the signal properly, due to it missing the carrier which is key for these sets. A good compromise might be to use DSB with reduced carrier, making it able to be used with AM receivers while having a reasinably good efficiency.

== Spectrum ==
The DSB-SC signal is similar to a standard AM transmission, with two sidebands, one above the carrier and one below the carrier frequency (upper and lower sidebands, respectively), only missing the large spike' of the carrier frequency.

Spectrum plot of a DSB-SC signal:

== Generation ==
DSB-SC is generated by a mixer. The signal produced is the product of the message signal and a carrier signal. The mathematical representation of this process is shown below, where the product-to-sum trigonometric identity is used.

$$\underbrace{V_m \cos \left( \omega_m t \right)}_{\mbox{Message}} \times
\underbrace{V_c \cos \left( \omega_c t \right)}_{\mbox{Carrier}} =
\underbrace{\frac{V_m V_c}{2} \left[
\cos\left(\left( \omega_m + \omega_c \right)t\right) +
\cos\left(\left( \omega_m - \omega_c \right)t\right)
\right]}_{\mbox{Modulated Signal}}$$

== Demodulation ==
In DSBSC, coherent demodulation is achieved by multiplying the DSB-SC signal with the carrier signal of the same phase as in the modulation process, analogous to the modulation process. This resultant signal is passed through a low pass filter to produce a scaled version of the original message signal:

$\overbrace{\frac{V_m V_c}{2} \left[ \cos\left(\left( \omega_m + \omega_c \right)t\right) + \cos\left(\left( \omega_m - \omega_c \right)t\right) \right]}^{\mbox{Modulated Signal}} \times \overbrace{V'_c \cos \left( \omega_c t \right)}^{\mbox{Carrier}}$

$$= \left(\frac{1}{2}V_c V'_c\right)\underbrace{V_m \cos(\omega_m t)}_{\text{original message}} + \frac{1}{4}V_c V'_c V_m \left[\cos((\omega_m + 2\omega_c)t) + \cos((\omega_m - 2\omega_c)t)\right]$$

This equation shows that by multiplying the modulated signal by the carrier signal, the result is a scaled version of the original message signal plus a second term. Since $\omega_c \gg \omega_m$, this second term is much higher in frequency than the original message. Once this signal passes through a low pass filter, the higher frequency component is removed, leaving just the original message.

=== Distortion and attenuation ===
For demodulation, the demodulation oscillator's frequency and phase must be exactly the same as the modulation oscillator's, otherwise, distortion and/or attenuation will occur.

To see this effect, take the following conditions:

- Message signal to be transmitted: $f(t)$
- Modulation (carrier) signal: $V_c\cos(\omega_c t)$
- Demodulation signal (with small frequency and phase deviations from the modulation signal): $V'_c\cos\left[(\omega_c+\Delta\omega)t + \theta\right]$

The resultant signal can then be given by

$f(t) \times V_c\cos(\omega_c t) \times V'_c\cos\left[(\omega_c+\Delta\omega)t + \theta\right]$

$$=\frac{1}{2}V_c V'_c f(t) \cos\left(\Delta\omega\cdot t+\theta\right) + \frac{1}{2}V_c V'_c f(t) \cos\left[(2\omega_c+\Delta\omega)t+\theta\right]$$
$$\xrightarrow{\text{After low pass filter}} \frac{1}{2}V_c V'_c f(t) \cos\left(\Delta\omega\cdot t+\theta\right)$$

The $\cos\left(\Delta\omega\cdot t+\theta\right)$ terms results in distortion and attenuation of the original message signal. In particular, if the frequencies are correct, but the phase is wrong, contribution from $\theta$ is a constant attenuation factor, also $\Delta\omega\cdot t$ represents a cyclic inversion of the recovered signal, which is a serious form of distortion.

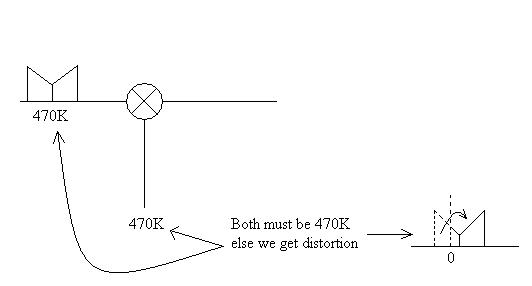

== Waveforms ==
Below is a message signal that one may wish to modulate onto a carrier, consisting of a couple of sinusoidal components with frequencies respectively 800 Hz and 1200 Hz.

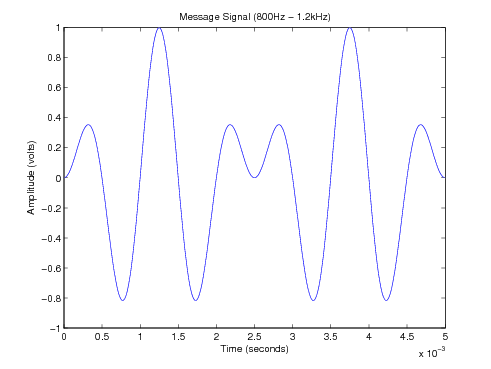

The equation for this message signal is $s(t) = \frac{1}{2}\cos\left(2\pi 800 t\right) - \frac{1}{2}\cos\left( 2\pi 1200 t\right)$.

The carrier, in this case, is a plain 5 kHz ($c(t) = \cos\left( 2\pi 5000 t \right)$) sinusoid—pictured below.

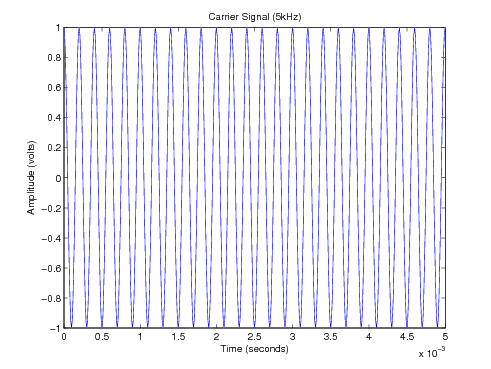

The modulation is performed by multiplication in the time domain, which yields a 5 kHz carrier signal, whose amplitude varies in the same manner as the message signal.

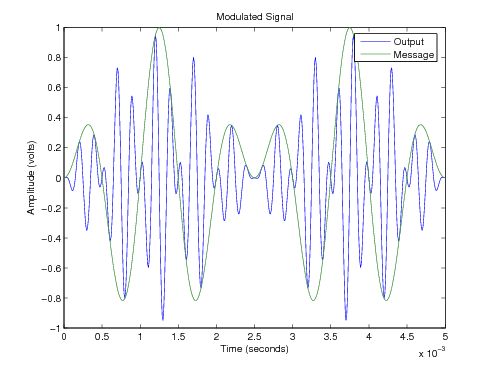

$x(t) = \underbrace{\cos\left( 2\pi 5000 t \right)}_\mbox{Carrier} \times \underbrace{\left[\frac{1}{2}\cos\left(2\pi 800 t\right) - \frac{1}{2}\cos\left( 2\pi 1200 t\right)\right]}_\mbox{Message Signal}$

The name "suppressed carrier" comes about because the carrier signal component is suppressed—it does not appear in the output signal. This is apparent when the spectrum of the output signal is viewed. In the picture shown below we see four peaks, the two peaks below 5,000 Hz are the lower sideband (LSB) and the two peaks above 5,000 Hz are the upper sideband (USB), but there is no peak at the 5,000 Hz mark, which is the frequency of the suppressed carrier.

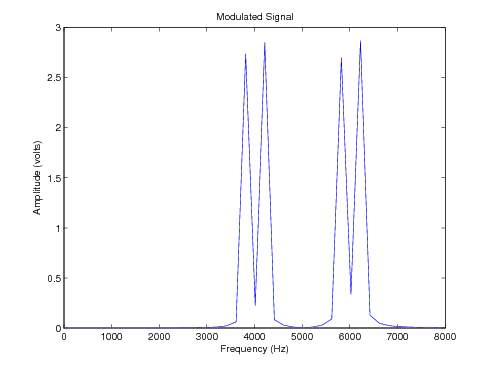

== Applications ==
DSB-SC is used to encode the difference signal in the FM broadcast stereo subcarrier. The (L+R) signal is limited from 0 Hz to 15 kHz. The (L−R) signal, which is also limited to 15 kHz, is modulated onto a 38 kHz DSB-SC carrier, occupying 23 kHz to 53 kHz. A 19 kHz pilot signal, at exactly half the 38 kHz sub-carrier frequency and with a precise phase relationship to it is also generated. The pilot is transmitted at reduced modulation level and used by the receiver to identify a stereo transmission and to regenerate the 38 kHz sub-carrier with the correct phase. The composite stereo multiplex signal contains the main channel (L+R), the pilot tone, and the (L−R) difference signal. The (L-R) is added or subtracted with (L+R) to extract the left and right channels.
