= Plate detector =

Plate detector may refer to:

- Plate detector (radio), in electronics, used to demodulate amplitude modulated carrier signal
- Microchannel plate detector, used to detect single particles (electrons, ions and neutrons) and photons
