= DSSC =

DSSC may mean:

- Double-sideband suppressed carrier, radio technology
- Data Storage Systems Center at Carnegie Mellon University
- The Defense Services Staff College in Wellington, Tamil Nadu, India
- D.S. Senanayake College Colombo 7, Sri Lanka
- Dye-sensitized solar cell
