= Wunderlich (vacuum tube) =

Wunderlich refers to a series of vacuum tubes introduced in the early 1930s. Wunderlichs were designed to be used as full-wave detectors in AM radio receivers. However, because of their unusual design, they were rarely used in commercially manufactured receivers. The tube is named for its inventor, Norman Wunderlich.

== Structure ==
The Wunderlich tube is a twin medium-mu triode. The tube has two identical control grids that operate in tandem with a common heater, indirectly heated cathode and plate.

== Function ==
Typically, the two grids are connected to opposite ends of the center-tapped secondary of the final IF transformer. The center tap of the secondary is then connected to ground through a parallel-connected resistor and capacitor circuit. This causes the tube to act as a full-wave grid leak detector. In some circuits, the center tap also provides AVC bias voltage to the converter and/or IF amplifier. Some Wunderlichs, like the Wunderlich B, have a diode plate or a second grid that provide AVC bias voltage.
