= Hilmer Swanson =

American inventor (1932–2005)

Hilmer Irvin Swanson (July 25, 1932 Davenport, Iowa – July 21, 2005 Quincy, Illinois) was an American radio engineer who developed several leading, patented techniques for broadcast radio Amplitude modulation (AM) while working for Harris Corporation.

== Early years and education ==
Swanson was educated in his home town of Davenport, Iowa, from a rural one room school house to high school. He was then drafted into the U.S. Army during the Korean War and served with the 10th Army Mountain Division at Fort Riley, Kansas. The Army Signal Corps sent him to its school at Fort Gordon, where he graduated with honors. Hilmer was assigned to Fort Huachuca where he was involved with AM transmitters with the US Army Electronic Proving Ground (EPG), and began his career in radio.

Upon demobilization with an honorable discharge on June 25, 1953, he went to Indiana and worked briefly with Bendix, then attended Valparaiso's Technical Institute (closed 1991), and was awarded the degree of Bachelor of Science in Electrical Engineering. He then was awarded the degree of Master of Science In Electrical Engineering from Iowa State University on February 4, 1959.

== Working life ==
Swanson worked for Collins Radio in Cedar Rapids, Iowa and Dallas, Texas before joining Gates Radio in Quincy Illinois, which was later bought by Harris Corporation.

Swanson worked for Harris for 35 years until retirement in 1999, primarily on the design of high efficiency amplitude modulation (AM) transmitters. His work led to a series of patents on various types of high efficiency modulation, and led to the first commercial implementation of pulse duration modulation (PDM) system, and later progressive series modulation (PSM), polyphase PDM, and digital amplitude modulation.

Swanson's patents led to almost all AM broadcast transmitters being designed using digital modulation techniques, and made AM vacuum tube transmitters obsolete.

Swanson designed and developed a 2 Million Watt transmitter for the Voice of America. It still stands as the world's most powerful AM Broadcast transmitter ever made.

One of his last works was a paper, "Performance of Modern AM Modulation Methods for Linear Digital Broadcast Applications," co-authored with John DeLay.

== Honors ==
Swanson was a made a Harris Fellow, the highest honor given to an employee of that company. After retirement, Harris created a scholarship in Swanson's name at the John Wood Community College in Quincy, Illinois for the study of radio broadcast technology. Phillip W. Farmer, former Harris Chairman, President and CEO, said, "Mr. Swanson, a Senior Scientist at the Broadcast Communications Division has become a radio engineering legend in his own time. It is believed that no one has contributed more to the advancement of AM broadcast radio transmitters than Hilmer Swanson. Most famous are his PDM and PSM modulation techniques, and his "Crown Jewel"—the digital AM generation technology for Harris' DX series AM broadcast product Line."

In 1990, Swanson received the National Association of Broadcasters Engineering Achievement Award.

He was an honorary member of Society of Broadcast Engineers (SBE), and a life member of Institute of Electrical and Electronics Engineers (IEEE) and the Sigma Xi Science Honor Fraternity.

Swanson was awarded at least 28 patents in at least six countries

== Later life ==
In his retirement, Swanson and his wife, Carolyn, performed missionary work in Palau, Chile and Estonia working to establish Christian AM broadcast radio stations.

He was survived by three sons, a daughter, and their families.
