= Angle modulation =

Electronic method of transmitting information with a carrier wave

Angle modulation is a class of signal modulation that is used in telecommunication transmission systems using carrier waves. The class comprises frequency modulation (FM) and phase modulation (PM), and is based on altering the frequency or the phase, respectively, of a carrier signal to encode the message signal. This contrasts with varying the amplitude of the carrier, practiced in amplitude modulation (AM) transmission, the earliest of the major modulation methods used widely in early radio broadcasting.

== Foundation ==
In general form, an analog modulation process of a sinusoidal carrier wave may be described by the following equation:

$$m(t) = A(t) \cdot \cos(\omega t + \phi(t))\,$$.

$A(t)$ represents the time-varying amplitude of the sinusoidal carrier wave and the cosine-term is the carrier at its angular frequency $\omega$, and the instantaneous phase deviation $\phi(t)$. This description directly provides the two major groups of modulation, amplitude modulation and angle modulation. In amplitude modulation, the angle term is held constant, while in angle modulation the term $A(t)$ is constant and the second term of the equation has a functional relationship to the modulating message signal.

The functional form of the cosine term, which contains the expression of the instantaneous phase $\omega t + \phi(t)$ as its argument, provides the distinction of the two types of angle modulation, frequency modulation (FM) and phase modulation (PM). In FM the message signal causes a functional variation of the instantaneous frequency. These variations are controlled by both the frequency and the amplitude of the modulating wave. In phase modulation, the instantaneous phase deviation $\phi(t)$ of the carrier is controlled by the modulating waveform, such that the principal frequency remains constant.

For angle modulation, the instantaneous frequency of an angle-modulated carrier wave is given by the first derivative of the instantaneous phase with respect to time:

$$\omega_I = \frac{d}{dt} [ \omega t + \phi(t) ] = \omega + \phi'(t) ,$$

in which $\phi'(t)$ may be defined as the instantaneous frequency deviation, measured in rad/s.

For frequency modulation (FM), the modulating signal $s(t)$ is related linearly to the instantaneous frequency deviation, that is $\phi_{FM}' = K_{FM} s(t),$ which gives the FM modulated waveform as

$m_{FM}(t) = A \cos \left( \omega t + K_{FM} \int s(\tau) d\tau \right).$

For phase modulation (PM), the modulating signal $s(t)$ is related linearly to the instantaneous phase deviation, that is $\phi_{PM}(t) = K_{PM}s(t),$ which gives the PM modulated waveform as

$m_{PM}(t) = A \cos \left( \omega t + K_{PM} s(t) \right).$

In principle, the modulating signal in both frequency and phase modulation may either be analog in nature, or it may be digital. In general, however, when using digital signals to modify the carrier wave, the method is called keying, rather than modulation. Thus, telecommunications modems use frequency-shift keying (FSK), phase-shift keying (PSK), or amplitude-phase keying (APK), or various combinations. Furthermore, another digital modulation is line coding, which uses a baseband carrier, rather than a passband wave.

The methods of angle modulation can provide better discrimination against interference and noise than amplitude modulation. These improvements, however, are a tradeoff against increased bandwidth requirements.

== Frequency modulation ==
Frequency modulation is widely used for FM broadcasting of radio programming, and largely supplanted amplitude modulation for this purpose starting in the 1930s, with its invention by American engineer Edwin Armstrong in 1933. FM also has many other applications, such as in two-way radio communications, and in FM synthesis for music synthesizers.

== Phase modulation ==
Phase modulation is important in major application areas including cellular and satellite telecommunications, as well as in data networking methods, such as in some digital subscriber line systems, and WiFi.

The combination of phase modulation with amplitude modulation, practiced as early as 1874 by Thomas Edison in the quadruplex telegraph for transmitting four signals, two each in both directions of transmission, constitutes the polar modulation technique.
