= Double-sideband reduced-carrier transmission =

Type of amplitude modulation

Double-sideband reduced carrier transmission (DSB-RC): transmission in which (a) the frequencies produced by amplitude modulation are symmetrically spaced above and below the carrier and (b) the carrier level is reduced for transmission at a fixed level below that which is provided to the modulator.

Note: In DSB-RC transmission, the carrier is usually transmitted at a level suitable for use as a reference by the receiver, except for the case in which it is reduced to the minimum practical level, i.e. the carrier is suppressed.

== See also ==
- Double-sideband suppressed-carrier transmission
