= Polar modulation =

Modulation allowing for multiple signals on a line

Polar modulation is analogous to quadrature modulation in the same way that polar coordinates are analogous to Cartesian coordinates. Quadrature modulation makes use of Cartesian coordinates, x and y. When considering quadrature modulation, the x axis is called the I (in-phase) axis, and the y axis is called the Q (quadrature) axis. Polar modulation makes use of polar coordinates, r (amplitude) and Θ (phase).

The quadrature modulator approach to digital radio transmission requires a linear RF power amplifier which creates a design conflict between improving power efficiency or maintaining amplifier linearity. Compromising linearity causes degraded signal quality, usually by adjacent channel degradation, which can be a fundamental factor in limiting network performance and capacity. Additional problems with linear RF power amplifiers, including device parametric restrictions, temperature instability, power control accuracy, wideband noise and production yields are also common. On the other hand, compromising power efficiency increases power consumption (which reduces battery life in handheld devices) and generates more heat.

The issue of linearity in a power amplifier can theoretically be mitigated by requiring that the input signal of the power amplifier be "constant envelope", i.e. contain no amplitude variations. In a polar modulation system, the power amplifier input signal may vary only in phase. Amplitude modulation is then accomplished by directly controlling the gain of the power amplifier through changing or modulating its supply voltage. Thus a polar modulation system allows the use of highly non-linear power amplifier architectures such as Class E and Class F.

In order to create the polar signal, the phase transfer of the amplifier must be known over at least a 17 dB amplitude range. As the phase transitions from one to another, there will be an amplitude perturbation that can be calculated during the transition as,

$P(n) = \sqrt{I^2(n) + Q^2(n)}$

where n is the number of samples of I and Q and should be sufficiently large to allow an accurate tracing of the signal. One hundred samples per symbol would be about the lowest number that is workable.

Now that the amplitude change of the signal is known, the phase error introduced by the amplifier at each amplitude change can be used to pre-distort the signal. One simply subtracts the phase error at each amplitude from the modulating I and Q signals.

== History ==
The concept was described as "new" in a 1952 paper by the IRE (now IEEE).

A linear transponder using polar modulation is on board of the amateur radio satellite AMSAT-OSCAR 7, launched 1974 and operational today, 50+ years later. At the time, polar modulation was called "HELAPS" by its pioneer, the German scientist K. Meinzer.

== See also ==
- Angle modulation
- Phase modulation
- Phase-shift keying (PSK)
