= Double diode triode =

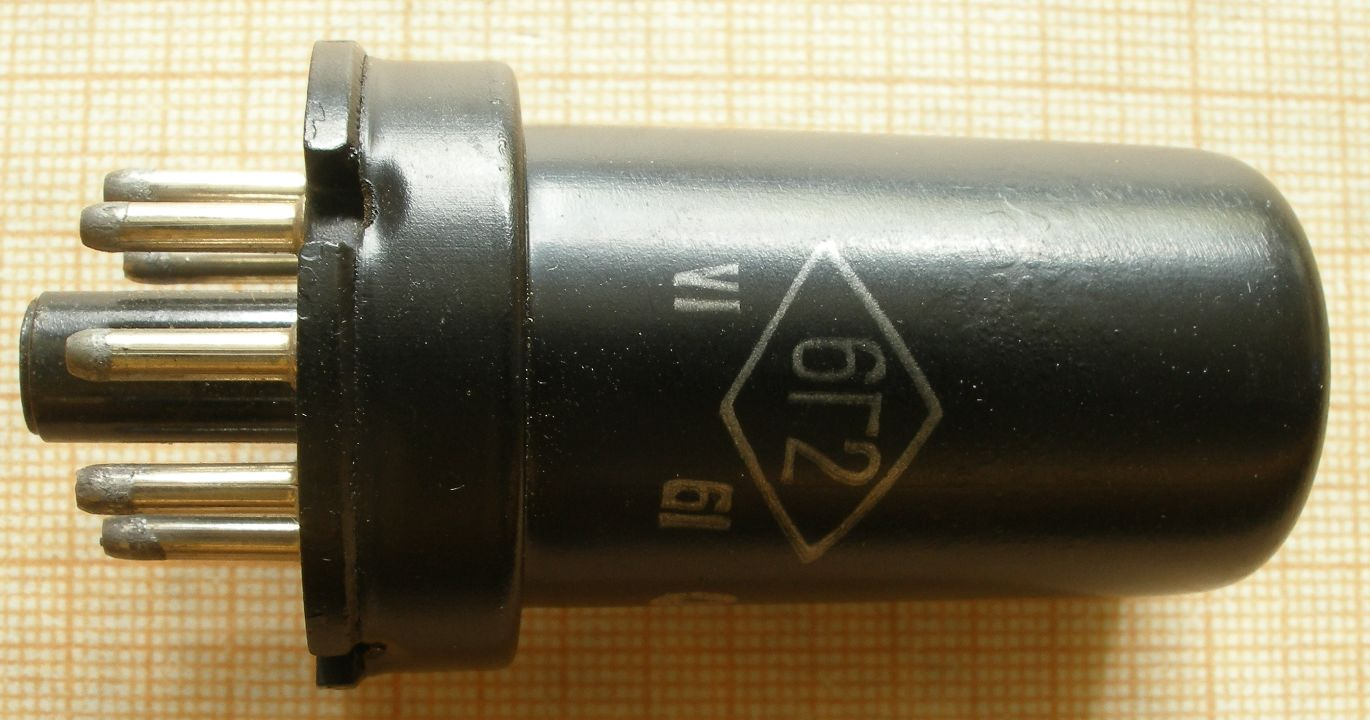

A double diode triode is a type of electronic vacuum tube once widely used in radio receivers. The tube has a triode for amplification, along with two diodes, one typically for use as a detector and the other as a rectifier for automatic gain control, in one envelope. In practice the two diodes usually share a common cathode. Multiple tube sections in one envelope minimized the number of tubes required in a radio or other apparatus.

In European nomenclature a first letter "E" identifies tubes with heaters to be connected in parallel to a transformer winding of 6.3 V; "A" identifies similar 4 V; "U" identifies tubes with heaters to be connected in series across the mains supply, drawing 100 mA; "H" identifies similar 150 mA, "C" identifies similar 200 mA, and "P" identifies similar 300 mA series-connected tubes. Following the voltage letter, "A" stands for a low-current (signal) diode section, "B" for a double diode with common cathode section, "C" for a triode section, "F" for a pentode section, "H" for a hexode or heptode section, and "L" for a power tetrode or pentode section. The first number identified the base type, for example 3 for Octal base; 9 for B7G sub-miniature 7 pin. The remaining numbers identified a particular tube type; tubes with all characters except the first identical had identical electrodes but a different heater; e.g. the EBC81 and UBC81. Generally, odd numbers identified tubes / valves with variable mu characteristics and even numbers straight, or sharp cut-off types.

American nomenclature, also used in Europe, used a number to identify the heater voltage, then one or two sequentially assigned letters, then a number specifying the total number of electrodes plus one. The 6.3V EABC80 has 7 electrodes; the US equivalent are 6AK8 and 6T8, where the "AK" and "T" have no particular meaning; the 6N8 (EBF80) is a dual diode+pentode with 7 electrodes.

There are many double diode triode tubes, including EBC81 (6BD7), EBC90 (6AT6), EBC91 (6AV6) and the older EBC1, EBC2, EBC11, EBC21, EBC33, EBC41 (identical to EBC81 but Rimlock (B8A) socket instead of noval), ABC1 (EBC1 with a 4 V heater), CBC1 (EBC1 with a 200 mA heater). The commoner tube line-ups of an AM-only radio set with mains transformer having a double diode-triode were one of the following: ECH11+EF11+EBC11+EL11 Y8A Base -or- ECH42 (or 41)+EF42 (or 41)+ EBC41+ EL41 (or 42) Rimlock Base -or- ECH81+EF80 (or 85 or 89)+ EBC81 (or 91)+ EL84 (noval Socket) + rectifier and magic eye indicator (depending on the radio class and manufacturer). AC/DC sets without mains transformer would use "U" tubes of the same types, e.g. UCH42+UF41+UBC41+UL41+UY41 rectifier.

There was also a tube with a double diode and a triode sharing a common cathode, and an additional, independent single diode section, named EABC80 or 6AK8 or 6T8 (with a shorter glass envelope) and its versions for AC/DC transformerless receivers with series heater chains, named PABC80 (9AK8, 300 mA for TV sets), HABC80 (19T8, 150 mA for radios) and UABC80 (27AK8, 100 mA for radios). This tube was designed for early AM/FM (MW/VHF) radio sets and was widely used until the end of the tube era; the double diode was used for FM demodulation, the third, independent diode for AM detection and/or automatic gain control (AGC).

The main configurations for an early tube AM/FM set using EABC80 in the 1950s and '60s were:

EC92+EF80 (or 85 or 89)+ECH81+EF80 (or 85 or 89)+EABC80+EL84 (or 95) -or- ECC85+EF80 (or 85 or 89)+ECH81+EABC80+EL84 (or 95)+ rectifier (tube or solid state) and indicator, depending on the radio class and manufacturer. For AC/DC radios, UCC85+UCH81+UF80 (or 85 or 89)+UABC80+UL84+ rectifier and indicator. These configurations were kept until semiconductor (germanium) diodes became available, making this type of tube obsolete.
