= Magnetic detector =

Early radio wave detector

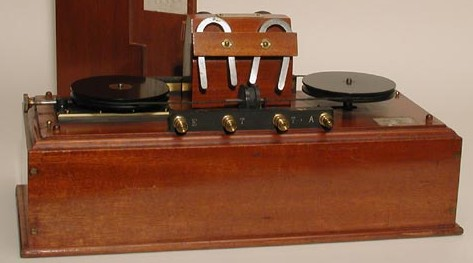
Marconi's wireless magnetic detector (London)

The magnetic detector or Marconi magnetic detector, sometimes called the "Maggie", was an early radio wave detector used in some of the first radio receivers to receive Morse code messages during the wireless telegraphy era around the turn of the 20th century. Developed in 1902 by radio pioneer Guglielmo Marconi from a method invented in 1895 by New Zealand physicist Ernest Rutherford, it was used in Marconi wireless stations until around 1912, when it was superseded by vacuum tubes. It was widely used on ships because of its reliability and insensitivity to vibration. A magnetic detector was part of the wireless apparatus in the radio room of the RMS Titanic which was used to summon help during its famous 15 April 1912 sinking.

== History ==
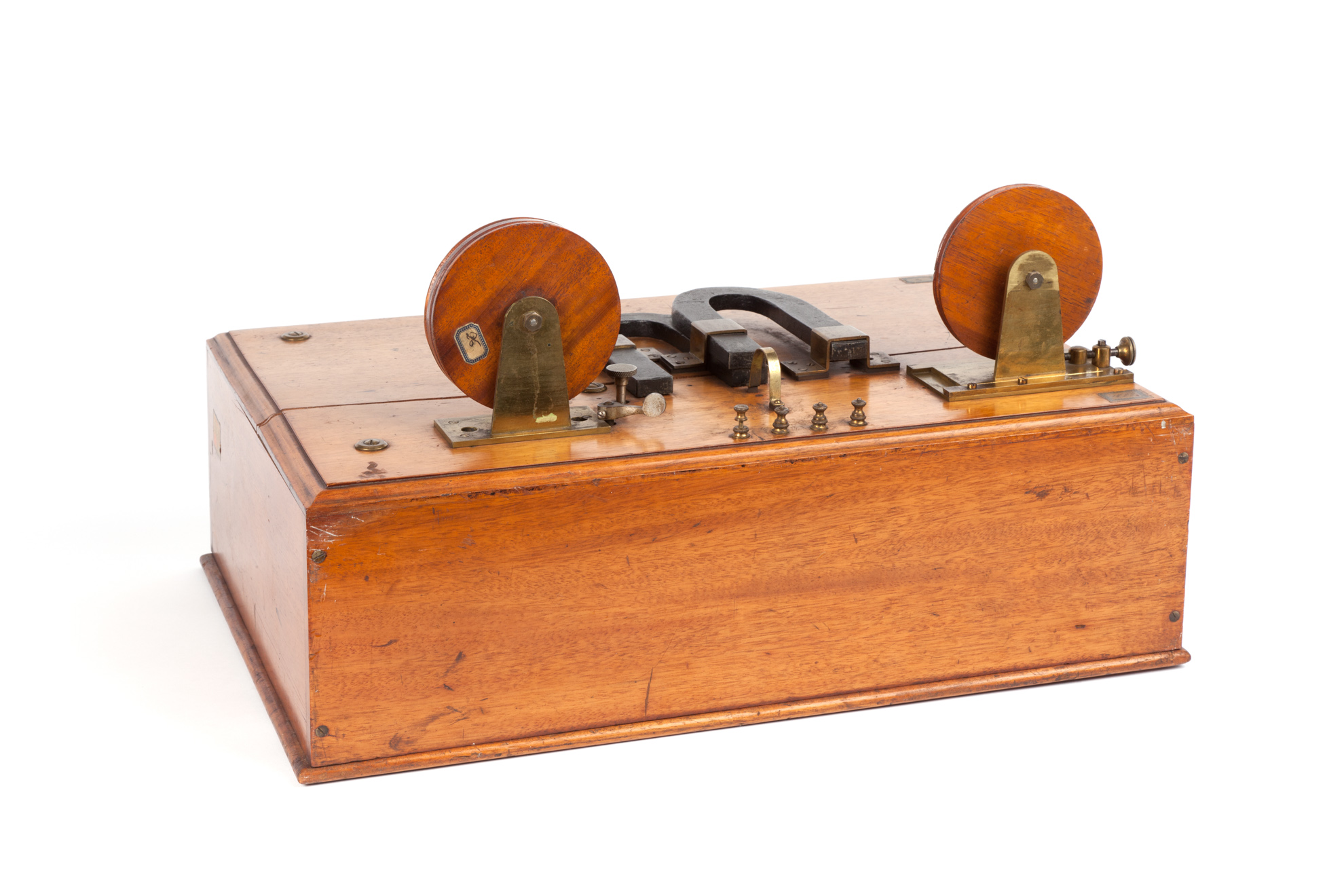
One of the first prototype magnetic detectors built by Marconi in 1902, in Milan museum. The sensing coils on this instrument are removed.

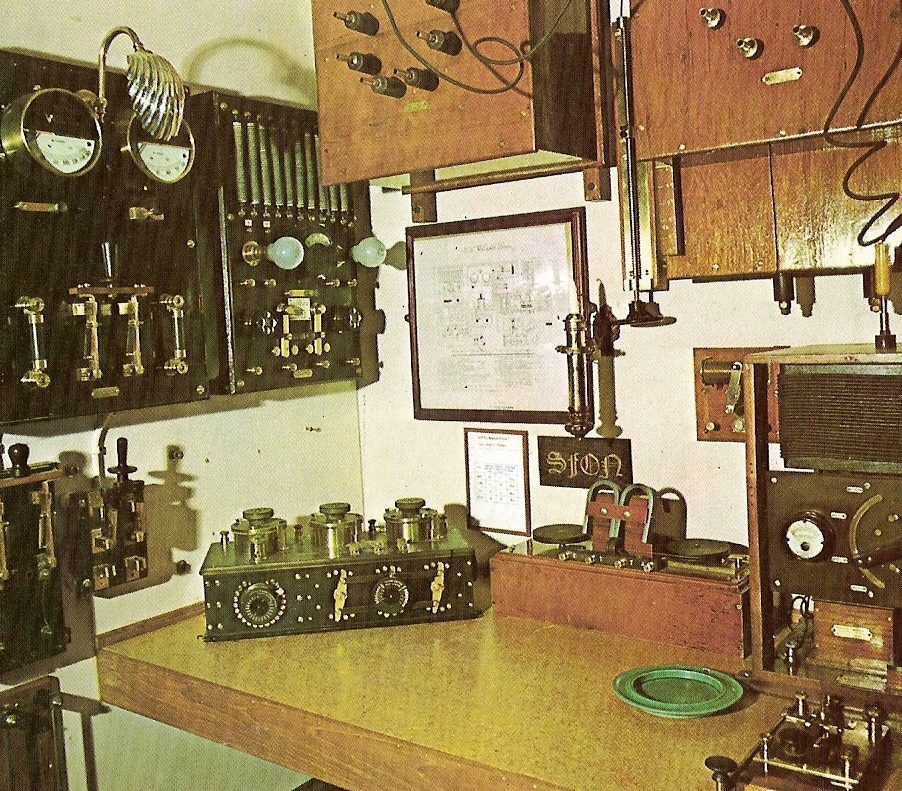
Recreation of a Marconi ship radio room at the Aalborg Maritime Museum, Aalborg, Denmark. A magnetic detector is on the desk to right of the Marconi tuner receiver, which provided the signal for the magnetic detector.

The primitive spark gap radio transmitters used during the first three decades of radio (1886-1916) could not transmit audio (sound) and instead transmitted information by wireless telegraphy; the operator switched the transmitter on and off with a telegraph key, creating pulses of radio waves to spell out text messages in Morse code. So the radio receiving equipment of the time did not have to convert the radio waves into sound like modern receivers, but merely detect the presence or absence of the radio signal. Any device that did this was called a detector. The first widely used detector was the coherer, invented in 1890. The coherer was a very poor detector, insensitive and prone to false triggering due to impulsive noise, which motivated much research to find better radio wave detectors.

Ernest Rutherford had first used the hysteresis of iron to detect Hertzian waves in 1896 by the demagnetization of an iron needle when a radio signal passed through a coil around the needle, however the needle had to be remagnetized so this was not suitable for a continuous detector. Many other wireless researchers such as E. Wilson, C. Tissot, Reginald Fessenden, John Ambrose Fleming, Lee De Forest, J.C. Balsillie, and L. Tieri had subsequently devised detectors based on hysteresis, but none had become widely used due to various drawbacks. Many earlier versions had a rotating magnet above a stationary iron band with coils on it. This type was only periodically sensitive, when the magnetic field was changing, which occurred as the magnetic poles passed the iron.

During his transatlantic radio communication experiments in December 1902 Marconi found the coherer to be too unreliable and insensitive for detecting the very weak radio signals from long-distance transmissions. It was this need that drove him to develop his magnetic detector. Marconi devised a more effective configuration with a moving iron band driven by a clockwork motor passing by stationary magnets and coils, resulting in a continuous supply of iron that was changing magnetization, and thus continuous sensitivity (Rutherford claimed he had also invented this configuration). The Marconi magnetic detector was the "official" detector used by the Marconi Company from 1902 through 1912, when the company began converting to the Fleming valve and Audion-type vacuum tubes. It was used through 1918.

== Description ==
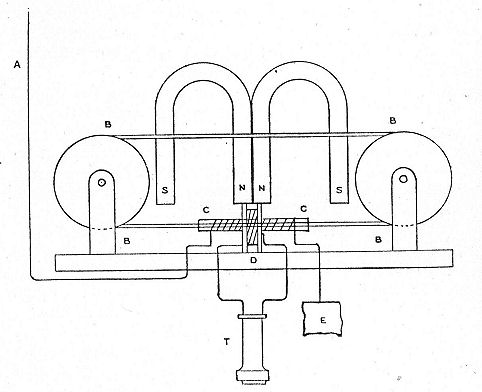
(A) Antenna wire, (B,B) Iron band around pulleys, (C, C) RF excitation winding on glass tube through which the iron band travels, (D) Audio pickup winding, (E) Ground-plate, (S, N) Permanent magnets, (T) Telephone receiver.

See drawing at right. The Marconi version consisted of an endless iron band (B) built up of 70 strands of number 40 gage silk-covered iron wire. In operation, the band passes over two grooved pulleys rotated by a wind-up clockwork motor. The iron band passes through the center of a glass tube which is close wound with a single layer along several millimeters with number 36 gage silk-covered copper wire. This coil (C) functions as the radio frequency excitation coil. Over this winding is a small bobbin wound with wire of the same gauge to a resistance of about 140 ohms. This coil (D) functions as the audio pickup coil. Around these coils two permanent horseshoe magnets are arranged to magnetize the iron band as it passes through the glass tube.

== How it works ==
The device works by hysteresis of the magnetization in the iron wires. The permanent magnets are arranged to create two opposite magnetic fields each directed toward (or away from) the center of the coils in opposite directions along the wire. This functions to magnetize the iron band along its axis, first in one direction as it approaches the center of the coils, then reverse its magnetism to the opposite direction as it leaves from the other side of the coil. Due to the hysteresis (coercivity) of the iron, a certain threshold magnetic field (the coercive field, H_{c}) is required to reverse the magnetization. So the magnetization in the moving wires does not reverse in the center of the device where the field reverses, but some way toward the departing side of the wires, when the field of the second magnet reaches H_{c}. Although the wire itself is moving through the coil, in the absence of a radio signal the location where the magnetization "flips" is stationary with respect to the pickup coil, so there is no flux change and no voltage is induced in the pickup coil.

The radio signal from the antenna (A) is received by a tuner (not shown) and passed through the excitation coil C, the other end of which is connected to ground (E). The rapidly reversing magnetic field from the coil exceeds the coercivity H_{c} and cancels the hysteresis of the iron, causing the magnetization change to suddenly move up the wire to the center, between the magnets, where the field reverses. This had an effect similar to thrusting a magnet into the coil, causing the magnetic flux through the pickup coil D to change, inducing a current pulse in the pickup coil. The audio pickup coil is connected to a telephone receiver (earphone) (T) which converts the current pulse to sound.

The radio signal from a spark gap transmitter consists of pulses of radio waves (damped waves) which repeat at an audio rate, around several hundred per second. Each pulse of radio waves produces a pulse of current in the earphone, so the signal sounds like a musical tone or buzz in the earphone.

== Technical details ==
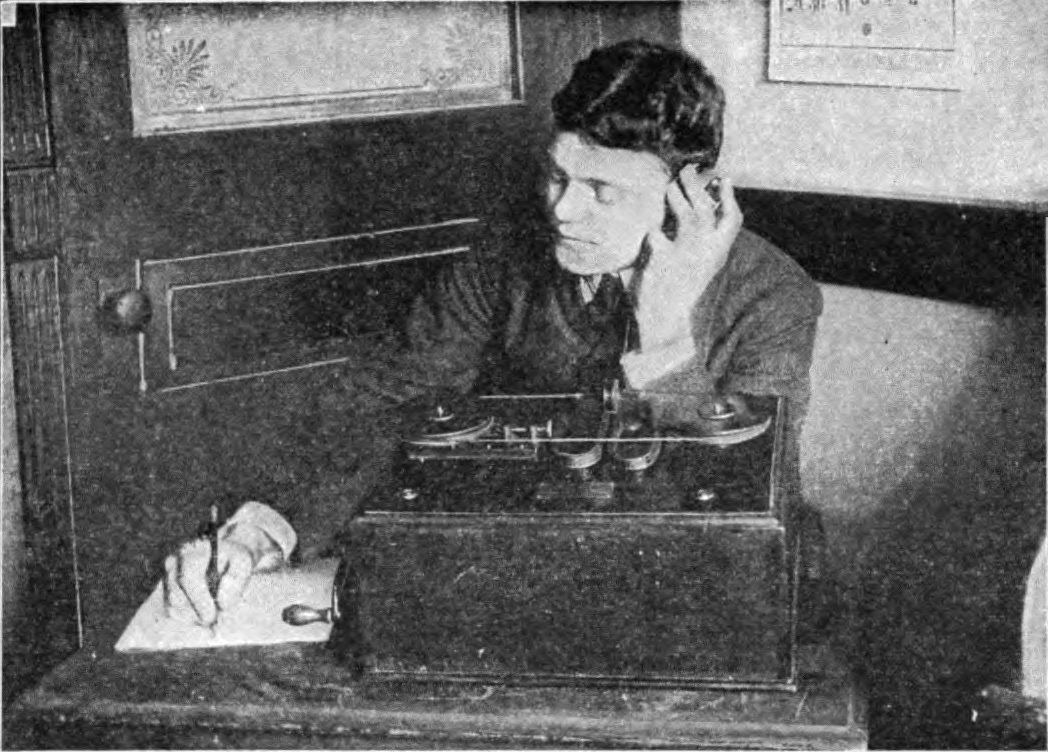
Magnetic detector in use

The iron band was turned by a mainspring and clockwork mechanism inside the case. Differing values have been given for the speed of the band, from 1.6 to 7.5 cm per second; the device could probably function over a wide range of band speeds. The operator had to keep the mainspring wound up, using a crank on the side. Operators would sometimes forget to wind it, so the band would stop turning and the detector stop working, sometimes in the middle of a radio message.

The detector produced electronic noise that was heard in the earphone as a "hissing" or "roaring" sound in the background, somewhat fatiguing to listen to. This was Barkhausen noise due to the Barkhausen effect in the iron. As the magnetic field in a given area of the iron wire changed as it moved through the detector, the microscopic domain walls between magnetic domains in the iron moved in a series of jerks, as they got hung up on defects in the iron crystal lattice, then pulled free. Each jerk produced a tiny change in the magnetic field through the coil, and induced a pulse of noise.

Because the output was an audio alternating current and not a direct current, the detector could only be used with earphones and not with the common recording instrument used in coherer radiotelegraphy receivers, the siphon paper tape recorder.

From a technical standpoint, several subtle prerequisites are necessary for operation. The strength of the magnetic field of the permanent magnets at the iron band must be of the same order of magnitude as the strength of the field generated by the radio frequency excitation coil, allowing the radio frequency signal to exceed the threshold hysteresis (coercivity) of the iron. Also, the impedance of the tuner that supplies the radio signal must be low to match the low impedance of the excitation coil, requiring special tuner design considerations. The impedance of the telephone earphone must roughly match the impedance of the audio pickup coil, which is a few hundred ohms. The iron band moves a few millimeters per second. The magnetic detector was much more sensitive than the coherers commonly in use at the time, although not as sensitive as the Fleming valve, which began to replace it around 1912.

In the Handbook Of Technical Instruction For Wireless Telegraphists by: J. C. Hawkhead (Second Edition Revised by H. M. Dowsett) on pp 175 are detailed instructions and specifications for operation and maintenance of Marconi's magnetic detector.
