= Le Conquet radio =

French maritime radionstation

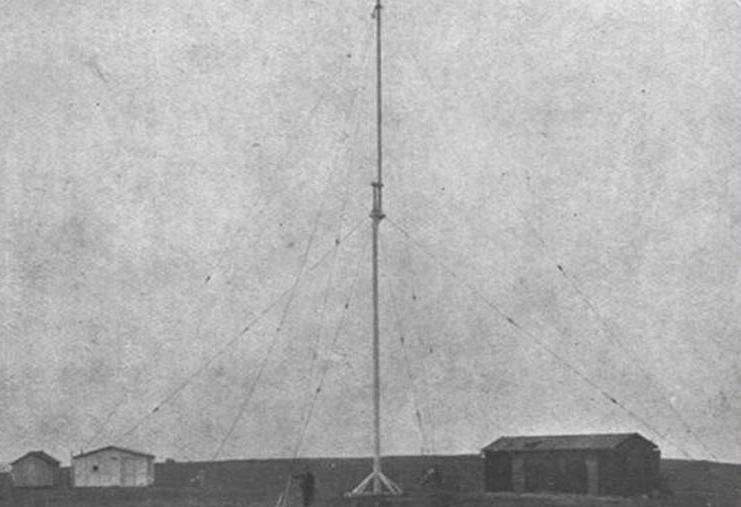
Original station in 1904

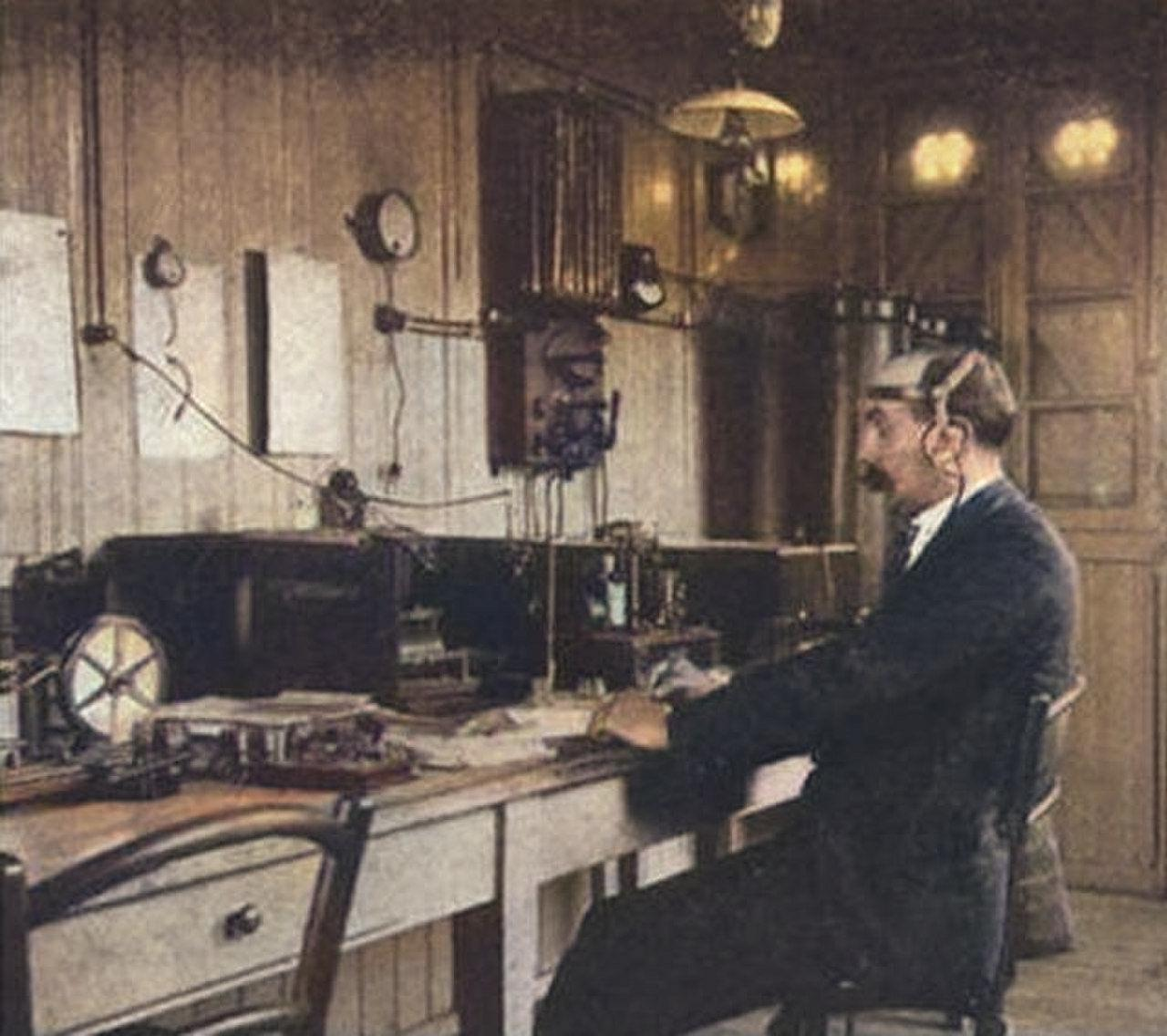
FFU operator at work in 1904

Le Conquet radio or Call sign FFU (station Française Fixe de Ushant) was a French maritime radio station located in the city of Le Conquet (La Pointe du Renard 4°43'58"W 48°20'24"N). The station was established in 1952, by the French Administration of France Télécom, as a result of the work by Call sign Ushant TSF, Call sign FFU.

== History ==
- French Fixe Ushant station. In French, since 1901, after having moved in several places on the island of Ushant, the station was to facilitate the exchange of telegrams between the island and the military staff at Brest. The station operated in both daytime and at night and was monitored by two officers working 12-hour shifts. It received the radio code FFU., the station Ouessant TSF, Ushant Code (radio) FFU (French Fixe Ushant station) (created by Camille Tissot), was as of 1904 the first operational French station in connection with one float of 80 Passengers ships on 500 kHz. Destroyed in 1944 per act of war, Ouessant TSF was never rebuilt. It was replaced in 1952 by the new station Le Conquet-Radio.
- Station of radiogoniometry of Ushant Gonio FFU, (in 1922) on wavelength 450 meters determined the position of ships, of airships which required it of him. (closed).

Station Le Conquet-Radio

- on 500 kHz (closed 1997)
- on 2182 kHz on channel 16 VHF (closed 1999)
- on MMSI: 00 227 0300 channel 70 on 2187,5 kHz (closed 1999)

== Wireless telegraphy ==
31 January 1997 at 23 h 46 Coordinated Universal Time

cq cq cq de ffu ffu ffu
f/cl down broadcast =
this is our final cry on 500 kHz before eternal silence stop
nearly all the century round ffu has provided w/t svc at the tip of brittany stop
thank you all for good kii good cooperation over decades and best wishes to those remaining on air stop
good bye from all at brest le conquet radio stop
silent key for ever stop
adieu 31 01 1997 / 2348 gmt b de ffu + + va. …
