= Futaleufú Airfield =

- IATA: FFU; ICAO: SCFT

Summary
- Airport type: Public
- Serves: Futaleufú, Chile
- Elevation AMSL: 1,148 ft / 350 m
- Coordinates: 43°11′20″S 71°51′00″W

Map
- Location of Futaleufú Airfield in Chile

Runways
Direction	Length		Surface
Direction	m	ft	Surface
09/27	948	3,110	Asphalt
- Source: Landings.com Google Maps GCM

Futaleufú Airfield (Spanish: Aeródromo Futaleufú, IATA: FFU, ICAO: SCFT) is an airport serving Futaleufú, a town in the Los Lagos Region of Chile.

Futaleufú is in a mountain valley 8 kilometres (5.0 mi) from the Argentina border. The airport is just east of the town, separated from it by a small lake. There is mountainous terrain nearby in all quadrants, with a large hill adjacent to the south side of the runway. An overrun to the west will drop into the lake.

== See also ==
- Transport in Chile
- List of airports in Chile
