= Synchronous detector =

Demodulator that uses a replica of the unmodulated carrier

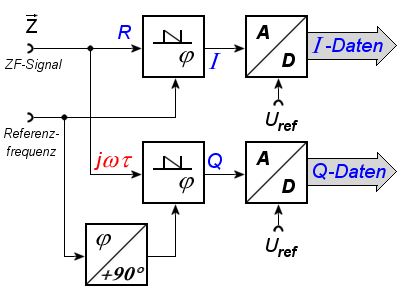
Synchronous detector

In electronics, a synchronous detector is a device that recovers information from a modulated signal by mixing the signal with a replica of the unmodulated carrier. This can be locally generated at the receiver using a phase-locked loop or other techniques. Synchronous detection preserves any phase information originally present in the modulating signal. With the exception of SECAM receivers, synchronous detection is a necessary component of any analog color television receiver, where it allows recovery of the phase information that conveys hue. Synchronous detectors are also found in some shortwave radio receivers used for audio signals, where they provide better performance on signals that may be affected by fading.

== See also ==
- Lock-in amplifier
