= Plate detector (radio) =

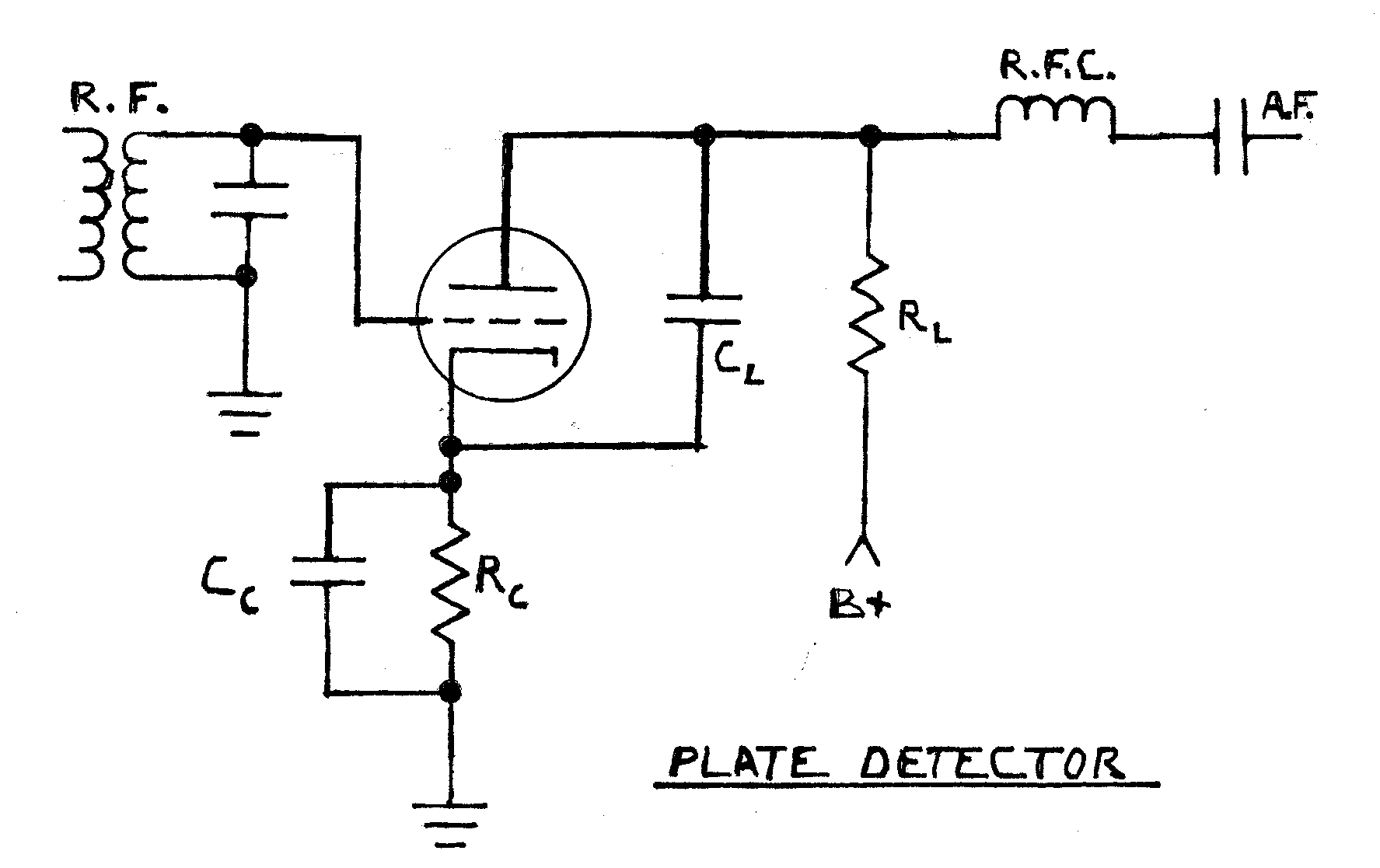
Plate detector circuit with cathode bias. Cathode bias RC time constant three times period of lowest carrier frequency. C_{L} is typically around 250 pF.

In electronics, a plate detector (anode bend detector, grid bias detector) is a vacuum tube circuit in which an amplifying tube having a control grid is operated in a non-linear region of its grid voltage versus plate current transfer characteristic, usually near plate current cutoff, to demodulate amplitude modulated carrier signal. This differs from the grid leak detector, which utilizes the non-linearity of the grid voltage versus grid current characteristic for demodulation. It also differs from the diode detector, which is a two-terminal device.

== History ==
Plate detector circuits were most commonly used from the 1920s until the start of World War II. In 1927, the advent of screen grid tubes permitted much more radio frequency amplification before the detector stage than previously practically possible. The previously used grid leak detector was less suited to the higher radio frequency signal level than the plate detector. Diode detectors also became popular during the later 1920s because, unlike plate detector circuits, they could also provide automatic gain control voltage (A.V.C.) for the radio frequency amplifier stages of the receiver. However, the dual-diode/triode and dual-diode/pentode tubes commonly used for detection/A.V.C. circuits had bulk wholesale costs that were as much as twice the cost of the tubes commonly used as plate detectors. This made plate detector circuits more practical for low-priced radios sold during the depths of the Great Depression.

== Operation ==
Negative bias is applied to the grid to bring the plate current almost to cutoff. The grid is connected directly to the secondary of a radio frequency or intermediate frequency transformer. An incoming signal will cause the plate current to increase much more during the positive 180 degrees of the carrier frequency cycle than it decreases during the negative 180 degrees. The plate current variation will include the original modulation frequencies. The plate current is passed through a plate load impedance chosen to produce the desired amplification in conjunction with the tube characteristics. A capacitor of low impedance at the carrier frequency and high impedance at audio frequencies is provided between the tube plate and cathode, to minimize amplification of the carrier frequency and remove carrier frequency variations from the recovered modulation waveform. The allowable peak 100% modulated input signal voltage is limited to the magnitude of the bias voltage, corresponding to an unmodulated carrier peak voltage of half the bias voltage magnitude.

Either fixed bias or cathode bias may be used for the plate detector. When cathode bias is implemented, a capacitor of low impedance at the carrier frequency and high impedance at audio frequencies bypasses the cathode resistor. Cathode bias reduces the amplification obtainable.

=== Controlling volume level ===
Plate detector circuits usually do not produce A.V.C. voltage for the radio frequency (R.F.) stages of the receiver. In these receivers, volume control is often accomplished by providing variable cathode bias of one or more stages prior to the detector. A potentiometer is used to implement the variable cathode bias. The most common connection of the potentiometer (typically 4 kΩ to 15 kΩ linear taper) is as follows:

- One end of the potentiometer is connected to the antenna coupling component;
- The wiper is connected to ground (in A.C. receivers) or B minus (in A.C./D.C. receivers);
- The other end of the potentiometer is connected to the cathode of at least one R.F. amplifier (in T.R.F. receivers) or the cathode of the converter and/or the I.F. amplifier (in superheterodyne receivers).

To set a limit on the ability of the volume control to reduce the bias on the stages that it controls, the potentiometer is often equipped with a mechanical rotation limit facility that prevents the resistance from being reduced below a specific amount.

- Other volume control circuits in non-A.V.C. receivers include:
  - A potentiometer (typically 500 kΩ audio taper) where the high end and center wiper are connected as above, but where the low end is connected to the control grid of audio output tube. (In this circuit, the potentiometer replaces the bias resistor for the output tube's control grid);
  - A linear taper potentiometer that adjusts the screen grid voltages of the R.F. amplifiers (if they are tetrodes or pentodes);
  - A linear taper potentiometer connected to the antenna (high end), ground (low end) and the antenna transformer primary or first tuned circuit (center wiper).

Because the volume control in non-A.V.C. receivers adjusts R.F. signal levels rather than A.F. signal levels, the volume control must be manipulated while tuning the radio in order to find weak signals.

=== Tubes commonly used as plate detectors ===
- '01A, 1H4G, 6C6, 6J7, 6SJ7, 12F5, 12J5, 12J7, 12SF5, 12SJ7, 24, 24A, 27, 30, 36, 37, 56, 57, 76, 77, 201A, 301A

== Comparison with Alternative Envelope Detectors ==
=== Infinite-Impedance Detector ===
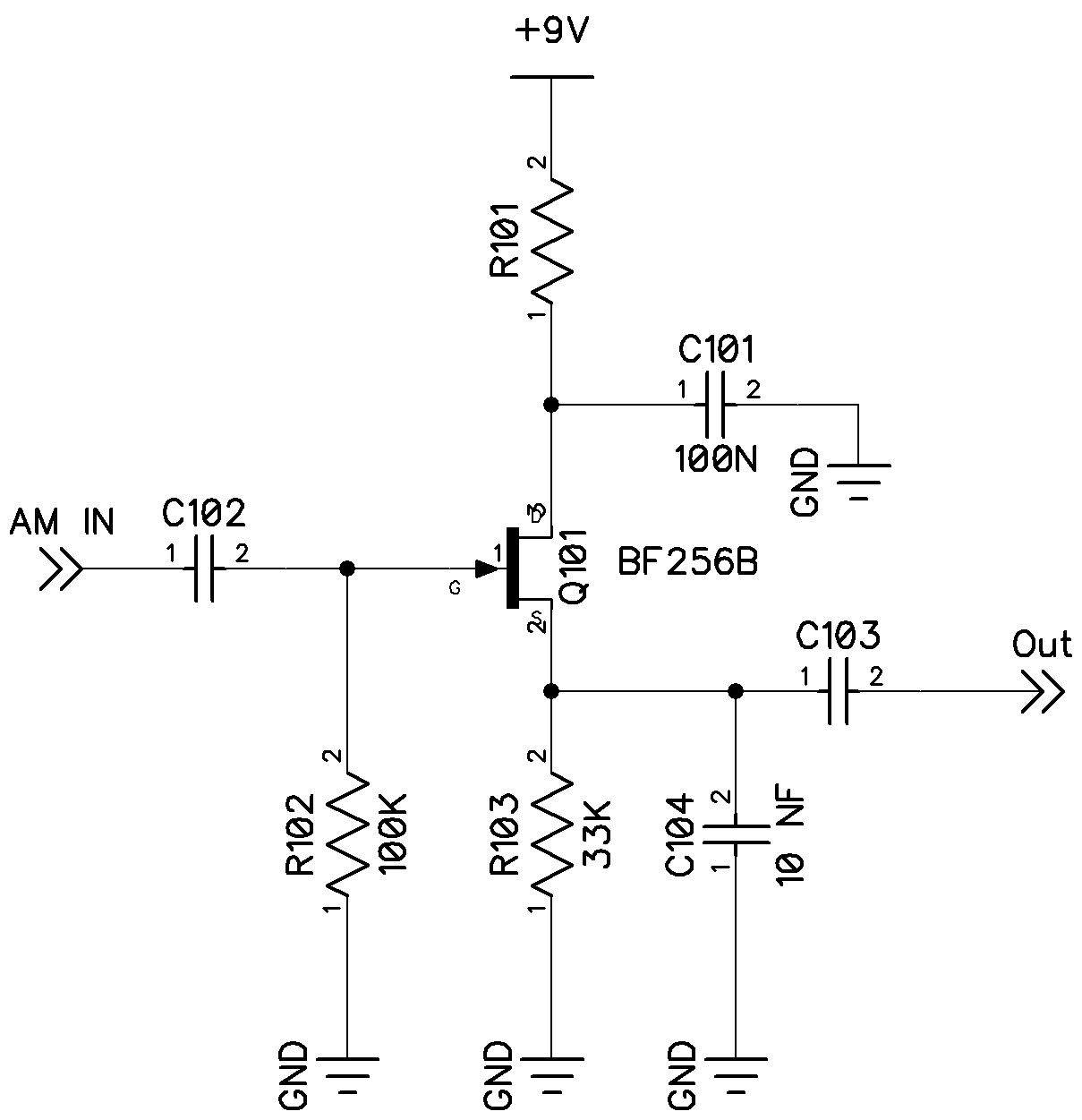
Infinite-Impedance Detector (Modern JFET Implementation)

In the Infinite-Impedance detector, the load resistance is placed in series with the cathode, rather than the plate, and the demodulated output is taken from the cathode. The circuit is operated in the region where grid current does not occur during any portion of the carrier frequency cycle, thus the name "Infinite Impedance Detector". An example schematic diagram of an implementation using a field effect transistor is shown.

As with the standard plate detector, the device is biased almost completely off. The positive-going 180 degrees of the carrier input signal causes a substantial increase of cathode or source current above the amount set by the bias, and the negative-going 180 degrees of the carrier cycle causes a very little decrease of cathode current below the level set by the bias. C_{2} is charged to a dc voltage determined by the carrier amplitude. C_{2} can only be discharged via R_{1}, and the circuit acts as a peak detector at the carrier frequency. The C_{2} R_{1} time constant is much shorter than the period of the highest modulating frequency, permitting the voltage across C_{2} to follow the modulation envelope. Negative feedback takes place at the recovered modulation frequencies, reducing distortion. The infinite impedance detector can demodulate higher modulation percentages with less distortion than the plate detector.

R_{1} values of 50,000 to 150,000 ohms are typical for tubes. The time constant of C_{2} with R_{1} is chosen to be several times the period of the lowest carrier frequency, with C_{2} values of 100 to 500 picofarads being typical. The low pass filter in the V+ power supply line, C4 and the RFC (RF Choke) shown in the diagram, minimizes unwanted RF coupling through the power supply to other circuitry and does not contribute to the function of the detector.

=== Summary of Differences ===
Detector:	Plate detector	Infinite-impedance detector	Grid-leak detector	Diode detector	Precision Rectifier
Suitable for Directly-Heated tubes	Yes	No	Yes	Yes	Unlikely
Suitable for AGC production	No (offset voltage too high)	No (positive-going)	No (offset voltage too high)	Yes	Yes
Typical Distortion	Low	Very low	Medium	Medium	Low
Loading of tuned circuit	Low	Low	Medium	High	Medium (Usually)
Quiescent current	Very low	Very low	High	Low or None (unless bias is applied to overcome V_{f} drop)	High (depends on op-amp employed)
Voltage Gain	Medium	Unity	High	Low	Unity (usually)
Maximum usable frequency	High (Miller effect limitations)	can be used at VHF	High	UHF and beyond (with appropriate diodes)	Low (slew rate limited)
Circuit Complexity	Low	Low	Low	Lowest	Highest
Most commonly found in:	Old short-wave receivers	High fidelity AM tuners	Single-tube regenerative receivers	Most AM receivers (from crystal sets to mass-produced transistor radios)	Test equipment
