= Carrier telephony =

Analog multiplexing technique used in early telephone systems

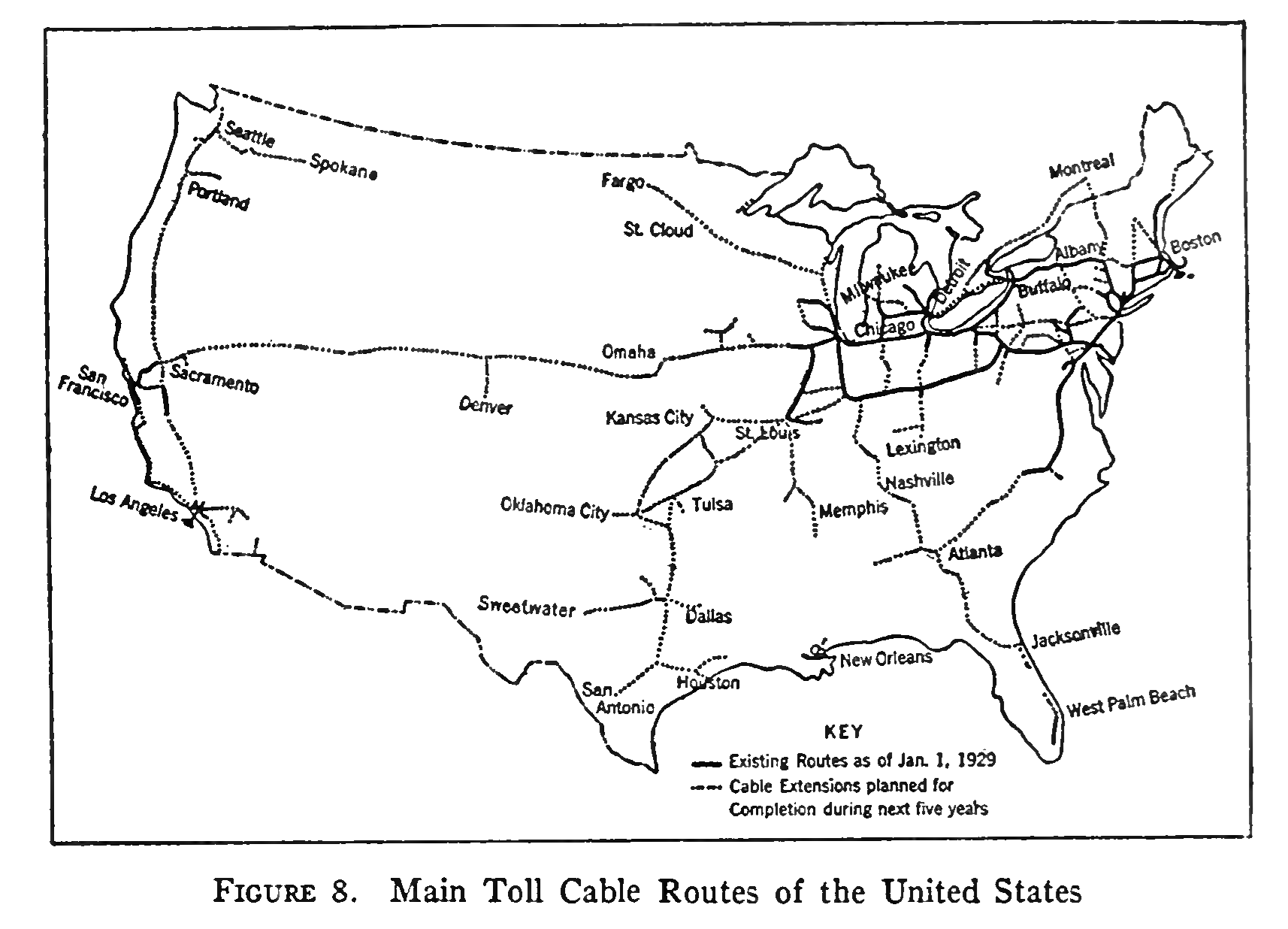
Early telephony circuits for long-distance calls. Solid lines shows extent in 1929, dotted lines show estimate for 1934.

Carrier telephony is a method for carrying several simultaneous long-distance telephone conversations over the same transmission line. Each conversation is shifted to a different frequency band, allowing the channels to share the line by frequency-division multiplexing (FDM). At the receiving end, filters and demodulators separate the channels and return them to ordinary voice frequencies.

The method was developed to increase the capacity of expensive long-distance lines without adding more wire. American inventor George Owen Squier demonstrated what he called "wired wireless" in 1910, and the Bell System introduced commercial carrier systems in the United States after World War I to meet growing demand for long-distance service without adding a new pair of wires for every conversation. Early systems added a few channels to open-wire routes (copper wires on poles). By the late 1930s, Bell Telephone Laboratories had adopted a standard group of twelve voice channels as a building block for open wire, cable and coaxial cable systems; it was later used in microwave transmission and submarine communications cable systems. Carrier systems grew steadily in capacity. Early open-wire routes on utility pole systems carried only a few additional conversations, while the Bell System's L5 coaxial system, introduced in 1974, could carry 10,800 calls on one coaxial pair and 108,000 calls in a ten-pair cable.

The development of carrier telephony changed the practice of electrical engineering. The systems needed filters to separate signals only a few kilohertz apart. Amplifiers for cable and coaxial lines had to add gain that matched the loss of the cable, without distortion. On the longest routes where hundreds or thousands of repeaters were in the path, a repeated small error grew to a failure. Consumers expected telephone service simply to work, but behind that apparent simplicity were thousands of miles of cable, thousands of circuits, and new approaches to accuracy, maintenance, testing, and reliability. Much of the later theory of filters, feedback amplifiers, equalizers, and communication channels grew out of this work.

Analog carrier systems were gradually replaced by digital transmission systems using pulse-code modulation (PCM), beginning with systems such as T1 in the early 1960s.

== Background ==
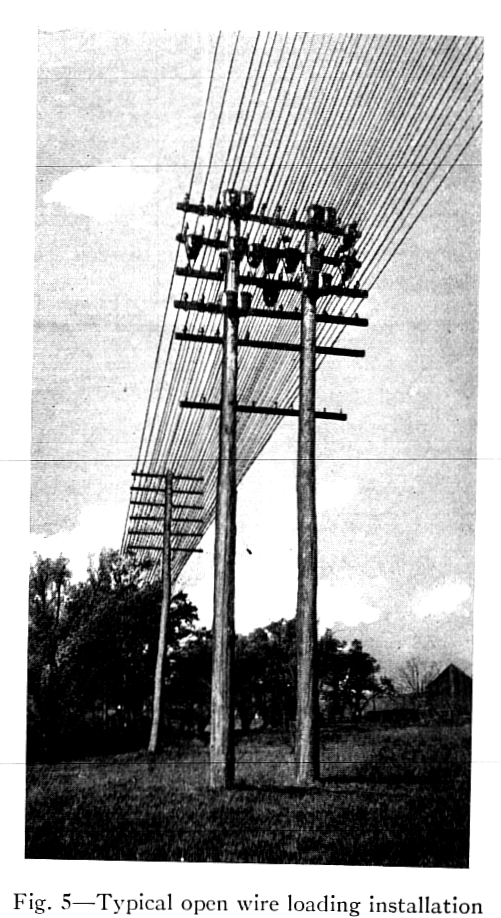
1926 open wire telephony line with loading coils. This set of lines has four 3-line phantom sets and nine other pairs for 21 circuits.

Before carrier telephony, long-distance voice circuits were carried at voice frequencies on open-wire pairs, consisting of two bare copper wires carried on poles (a two-wire circuit). Each conversation normally required one pair of wires. Two pairs, or four wires, could also be connected through loading coils to derive a third phantom circuit, allowing three telephone circuits to be carried on two physical pairs.

Open-wire construction made long-distance service possible, although it required large amounts of transmission line and equipment. In 1911, Bell System service reached from the East Coast to Denver using voice-frequency open-wire circuits. In 1915, vacuum-tube repeaters made transcontinental service possible between New York and San Francisco.

Telephone companies also used multi-pair cable. Toll cable (long-distance line) was commonly built from quads, with each quad containing two pairs of wires. With phantom-circuit operation, one quad could support three voice-frequency telephone circuits.

Long-distance traffic was growing faster than the physical network. In 1930, Bell System engineer W. H. Harrison reported that toll usage increased by 34 percent in three years, while traffic on transcontinental routes more than doubled. The growth required substantial expansion of the long-distance plant. Carrier systems provided additional circuits over existing open-wire lines and cables, reducing the number of new wires needed to meet the demand. Historian John Brooks described carrier as providing a much greater increase in call-carrying capacity than phantom operation.

Carrier telephony was developed to place still more conversations on existing wires by moving additional voice channels to higher frequencies. In normalized dollars, the US line cost for transmission decreased by a factor of 1000 in the period of 1925 to 1975.

== History ==
=== Early carrier telephony (1910–1920s) ===
In 1910, George Owen Squier demonstrated that more than one voice signal could be sent over a single wire circuit by placing a second signal on a high-frequency carrier. This was similar to the way speech could be carried by radio waves. Squier described the method as "wired wireless".

Bell introduced commercial carrier systems in 1918, after further development of the method for telephone lines. Early systems used open-wire lines and added carrier channels above the ordinary voice-frequency circuit. At the receiving end, filters and demodulators separated the channels and returned them to ordinary voice frequencies.

=== Early commercial systems (1920s) ===
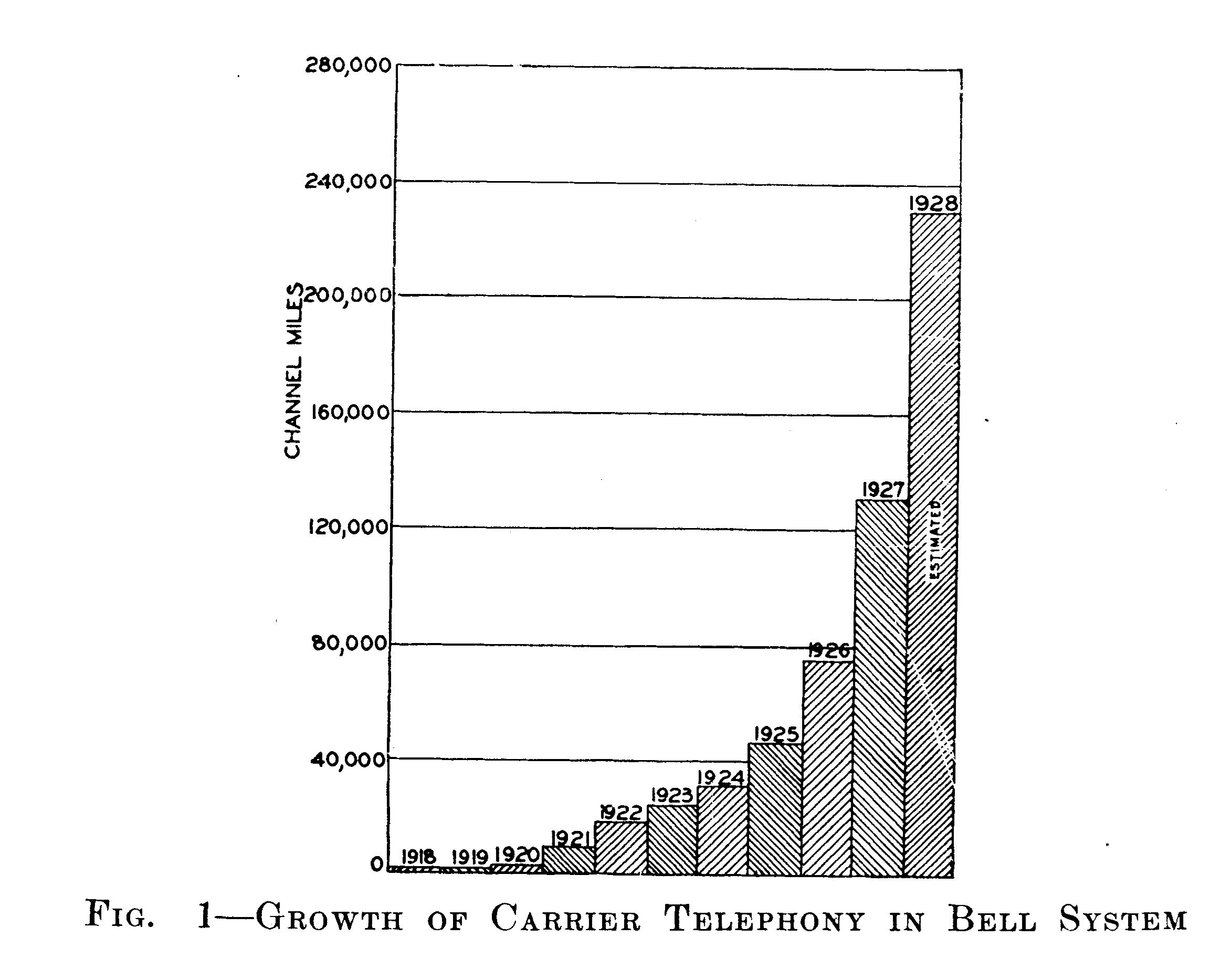
Carrier growth between 1918 and 1928

In 1915, J. R. Carson showed that a modulated signal could be separated into two sidebands, and that only one sideband was required to recover the original telephone signal at the receiving end. This became known as single-sideband modulation. Ralph Hartley later analyzed the relation between carrier and sideband components, showing that transmitting only one sideband saved power and bandwidth, allowing more signals to share the line. He also described a balanced modulator circuit for suppressing the carrier component.

In 1921, E. H. Colpitts and O. B. Blackwell published a description of several frequency-division multiplexed systems in use for telephony. These systems were used on open-wire transmission circuits. The labels Type A and Type B were applied in later publications. Test systems were operated between South Bend, Indiana, and Toledo, Ohio, and between Chicago and Toledo. Demand for telephone circuits during World War I led to installation of a test system between Pittsburgh and Baltimore.

In one carrier arrangement, an ordinary telephone signal occupied the 300 Hz to 3,000 Hz voice band. Three additional two-way circuits were assigned to carrier channels, with one direction occupying the 10 kHz to 20 kHz band and the other direction occupying the 20 kHz to 30 kHz band. Eight two-way telegraph signals were also multiplexed into the 3,333 Hz to 10 kHz band. One commercial system used on the Detroit–Harrisburg circuit transmitted the carrier along with each modulated voice signal. It carried three carrier signals in addition to one ordinary telephone circuit over 596 miles, quadrupling the previous capacity. Arthur A. Oswald later described carrier telephony as the first commercial use of single-sideband modulation.

Single-sideband transmission was used in the Harrisburg–Chicago carrier system, which suppressed the carrier and transmitted a single sideband to improve spectral and power efficiency. That system carried one ordinary telephone circuit and four carrier circuits on a single line. In 1936, a two-channel radiotelephone system was placed in service using the two sidebands independently. Later systems carried as many as four voice channels on a single radio carrier. Early systems also added multiple telegraph signals to lines used for telephony.

=== Long-distance open-wire systems (late 1920s–1930s) ===
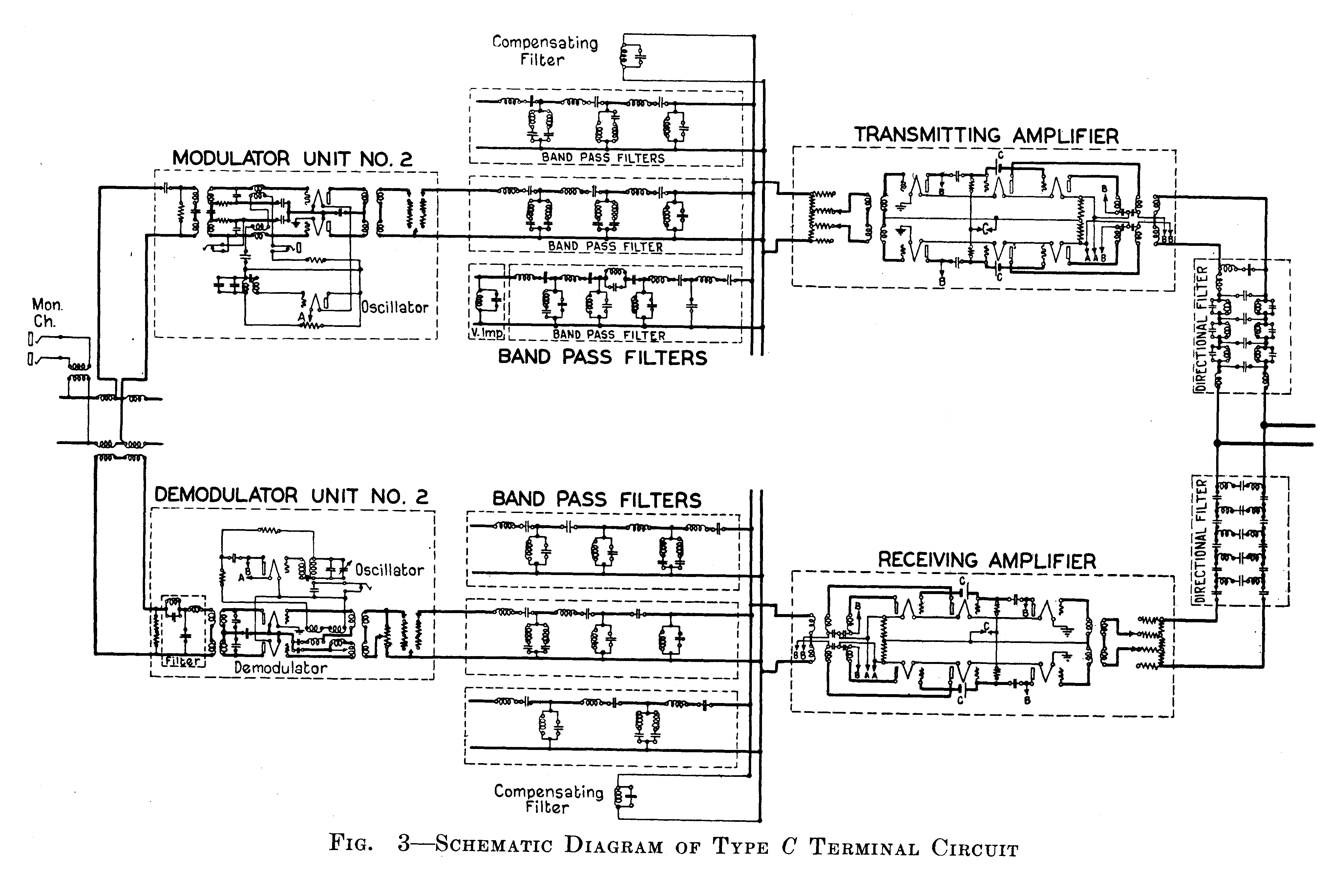
Type C system from 1928. Three carrier signals were transmitted in addition to one voice-band signal.

In a 1928 paper, the four-carrier-channel system described in 1921 was identified as Type A, and the three-carrier-channel system without carrier suppression as Type B. The same paper described a later open-wire system, Type C, which added three bidirectional carrier circuits to a bidirectional voice-band circuit on the same open-wire pair.

The Type C system was intended for long open-wire routes, from about 150 miles to more than 1,000 miles. It used single-sideband transmission with suppressed carrier, as in Type A, and used alternate frequency plans to reduce objectionable crosstalk (unwanted coupling of signals between nearby wire pairs) on the same pole route. From 1926 to 1928, Bell System use of carrier systems increased from about 130,000 channel-miles to 230,000 channel-miles, a measure equal to one telephone channel carried for one mile.

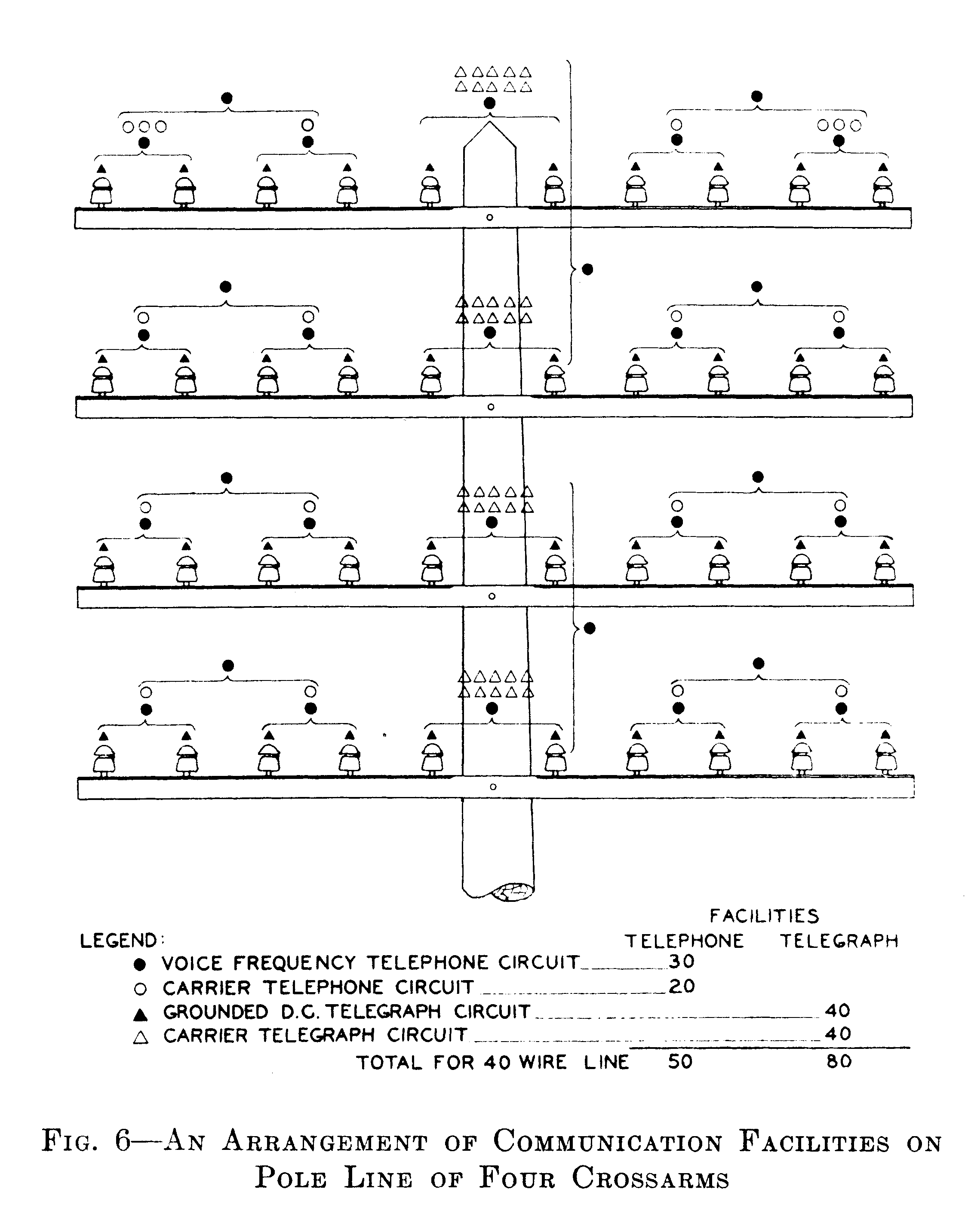
Four-crossarm telephone pole using Type C and Type D carrier systems with ordinary voice-band circuits and telegraph circuits

The Type D system was developed for shorter toll circuits of about 50 to 200 miles. It added one carrier circuit to a plain voice-frequency circuit, doubling the capacity of a pair at lower cost than the long-distance Type C equipment. For circuits longer than about 125 miles, an added amplifier produced the D-A version.

Type C and Type D systems could be used together on the same pole routes. One Bell System example showed a four-crossarm pole line carrying six long-distance Type C circuits, fourteen shorter Type D circuits, thirty voice-band circuits, and eighty telegraph circuits.

Engineering improvements and cost reductions widened the economic use of carrier telephony. By 1930, Bell described three-channel systems as suitable for long-haul routes of about 125 miles or more, while simpler one-channel systems made carrier economical on routes of roughly 75 to 125 miles. The shorter-haul equipment could sometimes be extended to about 200 miles by adding terminal amplification.

The last Type C circuit in the United States was taken out of service around 1980.

Different open-wire carrier technologies emerged outside the Bell System. In 1929, H. Sterky described a Swedish carrier-current system built by Svenska Radioaktiebolaget, Ericsson's subsidiary, for Mexico's telephone network. He described carrier telephony as suitable, for technical reasons, on aerial lines. The lines used copper or aluminium conductors; aluminium was preferred because copper was a theft target. The system lacked repeaters; the number of channels was limited by city-to-city distances. The first Mexican stage was installed on routes linking Mexico City, Vera Cruz, Celaya, Guadalajara, and San Luis Potosí. Individual spans carried up to three carrier channels; the Mexico City–Celaya route, for example, used three carrier-frequency pairs over 359 km. Each channel used one carrier frequency in each direction, spaced 5 kHz apart, with frequencies derived from a 5 kHz master frequency generated in Mexico City. Unlike suppressed-carrier single-sideband systems, the Ericsson system removed the lower sideband but transmitted the carrier together with the upper sideband, eliminating the need for a locally regenerated carrier at the receiver.

=== Morristown cable carrier trial (1933) ===
In 1933, Bell Telephone Laboratories conducted an experimental cable carrier installation at Morristown, New Jersey. The trial used a 25-mile length of underground cable with repeaters spaced at 25-mile intervals, arranged to simulate an 850-mile circuit with 33 intermediate repeaters. Nine carrier telephone channels were transmitted using frequencies from 4 kHz to 40 kHz. The trial demonstrated "very excellent" transmission quality and manageable crosstalk.

For test purposes, the nine carrier links were connected in tandem to represent circuits as long as 7,650 miles. The simulated circuit had approximately 1,300 dB of total attenuation, which was compensated by the repeaters. Stable operation depended on negative-feedback amplifiers, developed from work by H. S. Black. Bell Labs later described negative feedback as a key prerequisite for developing long-distance cable carrier systems.

Although not adopted immediately for commercial service because of economic conditions during the Great Depression, the Morristown trial established the viability of cable carrier systems. It bridged earlier open-wire carrier systems and the standardized multi-channel cable systems introduced later in the 1930s.

=== The 12-channel group systems (late 1930s–early 1940s): Types J, K, and L ===
By the late 1930s, Bell System carrier telephony had standardized on the 12-channel group as a basic multiplexing unit. The group combined twelve voice channels into a band 48 kHz wide, using 4 kHz channel spacing and single-sideband transmission. It was developed as a common first stage of modulation for Type J open-wire and Type K cable systems, as well as for the higher-capacity coaxial systems then being planned. Higher-order multiplex equipment combined these groups into the hundreds of channels carried by coaxial cable and, later, microwave radio-relay systems.

Type K, introduced in 1938, was used on buried and aerial cable. It used separate wire pairs for the two directions of transmission and was designed for long-haul routes, with repeaters spaced about 17 miles apart.

Type J, introduced in 1939, adapted the 12-channel group to open-wire lines. Because both directions shared the same wires, the two directions were separated by frequency. Initial installations included several long-distance routes totaling about 55,000 channel-miles, and Type J systems were often interconnected with Type K cable systems.

Type L extended carrier telephony to coaxial cable. Bell Laboratories tested an experimental coaxial carrier system between New York and Philadelphia in 1936–1937. The route was about 92 miles long and the cable itself was buried, with repeaters placed about every 10 miles. It used two coaxial units in one cable, one for each direction of transmission, and used a signal band from 60 to 1024 kHz. Completely built out, it would have carried 240 channels, arranged as twenty 12-channel groups, but only 3 groups, or 36 two-way voice channels, were completed. Test conversations were also made over a looped circuit equivalent to 3,800 miles.

The Type L1 system entered service in 1941 for very long-haul trunk routes. Coaxial systems carried many 12-channel groups by combining them into larger multiplexing structures, allowing much higher capacities than open-wire or paired-cable systems. During the 1940s, the Bell System expanded its L1 coaxial network to meet growing demand for long-distance telephone circuits and to provide intercity transmission paths for television. By the end of the decade, thousands of miles of L1 coaxial cable were in service in the United States. The same coaxial facilities could also carry television signals for network broadcasting. The 12-channel group later became part of the international multiplexing hierarchy standardized through the International Telegraph and Telephone Consultative Committee (CCITT).

==== British Post Office coaxial system ====
In 1937, the British General Post Office (GPO) described a wideband coaxial carrier system developed for trunk telephony and television transmission between London and Birmingham. The design used frequency-division multiplexing on coaxial cable pairs with negative-feedback repeaters along the route.

The system initially used 5 kHz channel spacing, with provision for later conversion to 4 kHz spacing. Eight-channel groups occupied the band from 60 to 100 kHz, with provision for expansion to ten channels within the same frequency range. Crystal filters were used in the channel-group translating equipment. Five groups formed a 200 kHz supergroup, and eight supergroups occupied frequencies from approximately 500 kHz to 2.1 MHz, allowing up to 320 telephone circuits on a single coaxial system.

Unlike contemporary Bell System practice, all carriers were derived from a master 400 kHz signal transmitted on the cable using frequency dividers and multipliers. Terminal stations were located in Faraday Building in London and Telephone House in Birmingham. Twelve new repeater buildings were constructed along the route, with additional repeater equipment housed in existing telephone properties. The equipment was placed in service on April 12, 1938, and was used both for trunk telephone service and experimental television transmission.

=== Postwar refinement and solid-state transition (1950s–1960s) ===
Telephone use increased rapidly after World War II. The number of subscribers grew, direct distance dialing required more circuits between exchanges, and network television created demand for more bandwidth between cities. From 1945 to 1975, Bell System demand for transmission circuits grew 14 to 15 percent a year. Much of the long-distance growth was carried by new coaxial-cable and microwave systems, which could transmit television as well as large numbers of telephone calls.

The economics of carrier equipment depended on route length and traffic. Carrier reduced line costs by allowing cables, poles, rights-of-way, and repeater sites to be shared by many circuits. Terminal equipment, the equipment to translate to and from normal voice channels, added a fixed cost at each end. Carrier systems were therefore most economical on long, heavily used routes. As terminal equipment costs dropped, the break-even distance became shorter, and carrier systems usage grew. By the 1960s, shorter routes had become a major market for carrier equipment.

The systems developed during this period were not simply successive replacements for one another. Some used relatively inexpensive double-sideband transmission and simpler filters where bandwidth was available and low terminal cost mattered most, much like the simpler amplitude-modulated carrier systems of the early period. Others used single-sideband transmission to obtain more circuits where line capacity was expensive. Compatibility also mattered: new equipment was often designed to use existing frequency plans, cables, repeaters, and terminal facilities. Carrier equipment meanwhile progressed from vacuum tubes through mixed tube-and-transistor designs to fully transistorized terminals, reducing size, power consumption, and maintenance. The market also included several competing manufacturers, including Lenkurt, ITT Kellogg, and General Dynamics, whose systems were often designed to operate alongside Bell System equipment.

==== Type-42 48 channel system ====
In 1950, the Lenkurt Electric Company announced a 48-channel carrier system. The paper's author described the history of carrier systems, including the J, K, and L systems. The life cycle of an invention was discussed: an initial phase demonstrating usefulness; a second phase of improvement, sometimes at high cost; a third phase focused on manufacturability; and a final phase realizing the full advantages of the method.

==== Type N and O short-haul systems family ====
After World War II, the Bell System used carrier systems on long routes, but most shorter links carried just one phone circuit on each pair of wires. Development of the Type N system began in 1945 to make carrier transmission economical on shorter cable routes and compatible with the emerging toll-dialing network. The N-1 system carried twelve voice circuits on cable over routes of 15 to 200 miles. It used amplitude modulation with both sidebands and the carrier transmitted. This required more bandwidth than single-sideband transmission but saved the expense of crystal filters by using LC filters.

Companding was central to the performance and economics of N-1. The amplitude of the speech compressed before transmission and expanded at the receiver, restoring the original amplitude. This reduced the system noise by more than 20 dB, relaxing the requirements on repeater linearity, crosstalk, and allowing greater repeater spacing. The compact companders developed for N-1 were used in later carrier equipment. To reduce crosstalk between cable pairs, N-1 repeaters exchanged the high- and low-frequency allocations in successive line sections, a technique they called frequency frogging. Production equipment entered service in 1950. By the end of 1953, more N-1 channels were in service than either Type K or Type L carrier channels.

The success of N-1 on cable led Bell Laboratories to apply the same approach to open-wire lines. Type O was the open-wire equivalent of N-1. The basic unit was a four-channels intended for routes of 15 to 150 miles. Up to four groups, each assigned a different frequency range, could work together to give sixteen circuits on one open-wire pair. Type ON equipment translated four-channel O groups directly into frequencies carried by the N system, allowing cable and open-wire to be mixed. ON1 increased the channel count to 20, the later ON2 arrangement added another four-channel group, increasing the capacity of a cable arrangement to 24 circuits. Thus each system built on the preceding one: N served cable, O extended short-haul carrier to open wire, and ON joined the two.

Demand during the later 1950s increased both the number of short-haul circuits and the number of carrier links that might be connected in tandem. This required tighter control of gain, noise, crosstalk, and frequency response. Bell first developed the transistorized N1A repeater and then redesigned the terminal and repeater equipment as the Type N2 system. N2 retained the twelve-channel double-sideband format of N-1, but used solid-state circuits, printed circuit wiring, and plug-in modules. The Bell System introduced N2 in 1962, and Western Electric produced more than 9,600 terminals in 1964.

The Type N3 system, described in 1966, increased capacity to 24 channels by using single-sideband transmission. It was designed for routes of about 35 to 200 miles, where savings in cable and repeater capacity outweighed the higher cost of the terminal equipment. N2 remained useful where low terminal cost was the most important, while N3 served longer or more heavily used routes. Both were designed to reuse existing cable, repeater locations, frequency allocations, and other parts of the established N-carrier system.

==== Lenkurt 45BN system ====
In 1955, the Lenkurt Electric Company introduced the Type 45BN cable carrier system. It was a 24-channel single-sideband system designed to operate on cable routes using Bell System Type N and Type O carrier allocations. The system used a 96 kHz band, operating either from 40 to 140 kHz or from 164 to 264 kHz. These allocations allowed it to share cable routes with Type N or Type O carrier systems.

When operated with Type N repeaters, the 45BN system used a pilot tone to correct frequency errors. A compatible repeater described in 1958 used transistors for low-level stages and vacuum tubes for the final amplifiers. The design reflected the limits of available transistors, which were not yet considered suitable for the higher-power output stages.

Lenkurt later became part of the General Telephone and Electronics equipment business. A 1968 review of the communications equipment industry described General Telephone as vertically integrated in a manner similar to the Bell System, with manufacturing affiliates including Automatic Electric, Lenkurt, and Leich supplying equipment to affiliated telephone companies.

==== K24A system ====
In 1960, ITT Kellogg described the K24A Syncroplex, a fully transistorized 24-channel carrier system intended for local trunk and exchange cables over distances of about 5 to 20 miles. Earlier carrier equipment had generally been too expensive and difficult to maintain for such short routes. The K24A carried 24 telephone circuits over two cable pairs. The authors described the equipment as one of the first large-scale applications of transistors to carrier telephony.

==== General Dynamics 12 channel system ====
In 1963, General Dynamics described a solid-state 12-channel carrier system for open-wire and cable applications. Its architecture and frequency plan maintained line compatibility with Type J and Type O systems. The system used amplitude modulation up to 350 kHz, with optional companding. Carrier frequencies were staggered with 8, 12, and 16 kHz spacing to simplify filter design. Modulation mixers were simple four-diode single-balanced designs. Demodulation used a single-diode AM detector, with carrier level feedback to set gain using a diode attenuator.

=== High-capacity coaxial systems (1940s–1970s) ===
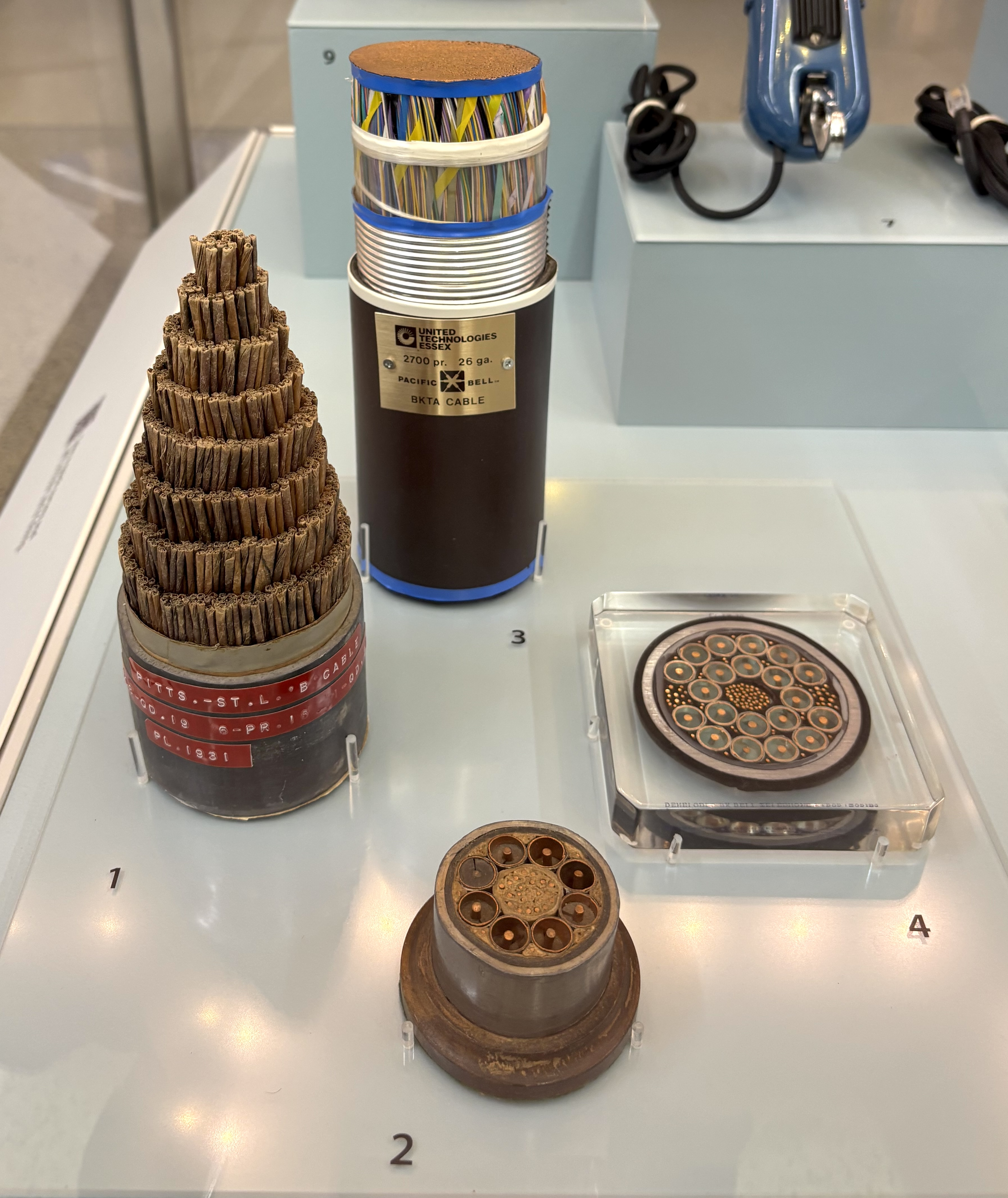
Telephony cable samples: 1) Twisted pair cable, dated 1931. 2) L1 coax cable with four pairs of coax. 3) 2700 pair cable. 4) L4 coax, 10 pairs, carrying up to 32,400 conversations.

In 1929, AT&T engineers Lloyd Espenschied and Herman A. Affel applied for a patent describing the transmission of hundreds of telephone channels, or a television signal, over coaxial cable. The greater bandwidth of coaxial cable made possible carrier systems with more capacity than open-wire or paired-cable routes. In early 1944, AT&T announced a large postwar program of coaxial-cable construction. Later that year it announced plans for both an extensive microwave network and a new coaxial system with a bandwidth of about 7 MHz. Development of the new system, designated L3, began late in 1945. Its purpose was to obtain substantially greater capacity from the coaxial cables already installed, while reusing as much L1 terminal equipment, carrier-supply equipment, and repeater infrastructure as possible.

==== Type L3 system ====
The L3 system entered commercial service in 1953. By then, about 8,000 miles of L1 coaxial cable had been installed in the United States. L3 was designed to operate on this existing cable and to reuse L1 channel banks, group and supergroup equipment, carrier supplies, repeater buildings, and other facilities. Each coaxial pair carried 1,860 two-way telephone circuits, about three times the capacity of L1. Alternatively, it supported 600 telephone circuits along with a television signal having a bandwidth of at least 4 MHz.

==== Type L4 system ====
Placed in service in 1967, the L4 system provided 3,600 telephone circuits on each coaxial pair. It was a solid-state system, with repeaters spaced approximately 2 miles apart, and operated with signals up to 17.5 MHz. Six hundred-channel mastergroups were defined as the standard within the Bell System, and L4 used six mastergroups. With a 20 coax cable, using 9 pair, and saving one for a spare, the cable could carry 32,400 conversations.

Two families of transistors were developed for the L4 system: one for low-power, low-noise circuits, and another for medium-power applications. A new diode was also developed for use in fully balanced ring modulators up to 18 MHz.

==== Lenkurt 60 channel system ====
In 1972, Lenkurt published a design in which 60-channel supergroups were modulated directly, rather than being formed from 12-channel groups. The design used integrated circuits and custom crystal bandpass filters built with multiple quartz blanks for harmonic generation and bandpass filtering.

==== Type L5 system ====
Placed in service on January 3, 1974, the L5 system supported 10,800 telephone circuits on a coaxial pair. A cable with 10 coaxial pairs could support 108,000 simultaneous telephone conversations. The channels were arranged in six jumbogroups, each containing six mastergroups, each mastergroup containing 600 channels. Repeaters were spaced at approximately one-mile intervals. Frequencies above 60 MHz were used. The final L5E (extended) version increased capacity. It added four mastergroups by packing the frequency plan more tightly and extending the transmitted band to 64.8 MHz. This raised capacity to 13,200 two-way voice circuits on each coaxial pair. A 22-tube cable, with 20 active tubes and two spares, could carry 132,000 two-way circuits. By 1980, L5 systems accounted for 66 million circuit-miles in the Bell System network.

=== CXR terminology ===
In Bell System usage, "CXR" was an abbreviation for carrier; field drawings therefore used forms such as "L CXR" for L-carrier facilities. A 1958 Long Lines route interconnection drawing, for example, labels an "L CXR switch" and "Lenkurt 45BX CXR terminal equipment" in a route using Type L1 carrier and 45BX Lenkurt carrier equipment.

=== Carrier development at Philips ===
In the Netherlands, the Dutch P.T.T. and Philips developed a 48-channel carrier system for carrier cables laid since 1935. The cables were suitable, as to attenuation and crosstalk, for transmission up to about 200 kHz with repeater spacing of about 25 km. The system used four groups of twelve channels, yielding 48 voice circuits per pair.

The Philips system differed from the Bell channel-bank arrangement. Instead of using twelve separate channel filters directly in the final group band, each voice channel was first modulated with the same 60 kHz carrier and passed through a 60–64 kHz channel-band filter. Twelve such basic channels were then each translated to form a 252–300 kHz basic group, and four groups were finally translated into the 12–204 kHz supergroup. The 60 kHz filter used Ferroxcube ferrite cores, not crystal resonators. Philips reported coil Q values of about 500–600 and a fivefold reduction in coil volume, achieved by using ferrites, compared to prior magnetics.

A 1952 Philips review described European development as a competition between quadded carrier cable and coaxial cable, with neither replacing the other outright. By 1930, 12-channel systems were used on paired and quadded cables, while coaxial systems debuted in Great Britain, Germany, and France between 1930 and 1940. Quad cables made in the Netherlands during and after World War II showed that well-made quad cables could carry 48 channels per pair, but coaxial systems offered much larger capacity on dense routes.

The trade-off went beyond bandwidth. Coaxial cable reduced crosstalk at high frequencies because its outer conductor shielded each tube, allowing hundreds of channels per pair. Coaxial systems packed many more circuits into each repeater. The Philips article compared 960 channels handled by a coaxial repeater to 60 channels in the quad-cable case. Coaxial systems thus demanded stricter repeater reliability, gain stability, and linearity, and made intermodulation and feedback design more critical.

== Technology ==
=== Influence on communications engineering ===
The demand for more telephone circuits made carrier telephony a major driver of circuit design and communications theory. E. H. Colpitts and O. B. Blackwell applied frequency-division multiplexing to telephone transmission. Closely spaced telephone channels required accurate filters, as developed by George Ashley Campbell, Otto Julius Zobel, and others. Long carrier routes required many repeaters in tandem, requiring low distortion and noise. This motivated Harold Black's negative-feedback amplifier, Harry Nyquist's stability criterion, and later equalizer and network-design methods by Hendrik Wade Bode and Sidney Darlington. The noise measurements and theory of John B. Johnson and Nyquist helped define the thermal-noise limits of repeaters and transmission systems.

The same telephone and radio transmission problems also shaped early information theory. Ralph Hartley's work on the transmission of information and Claude Shannon's mathematical theory of communication grew from questions of signal transmission, bandwidth, noise, and channel capacity.

=== Frequency planning ===
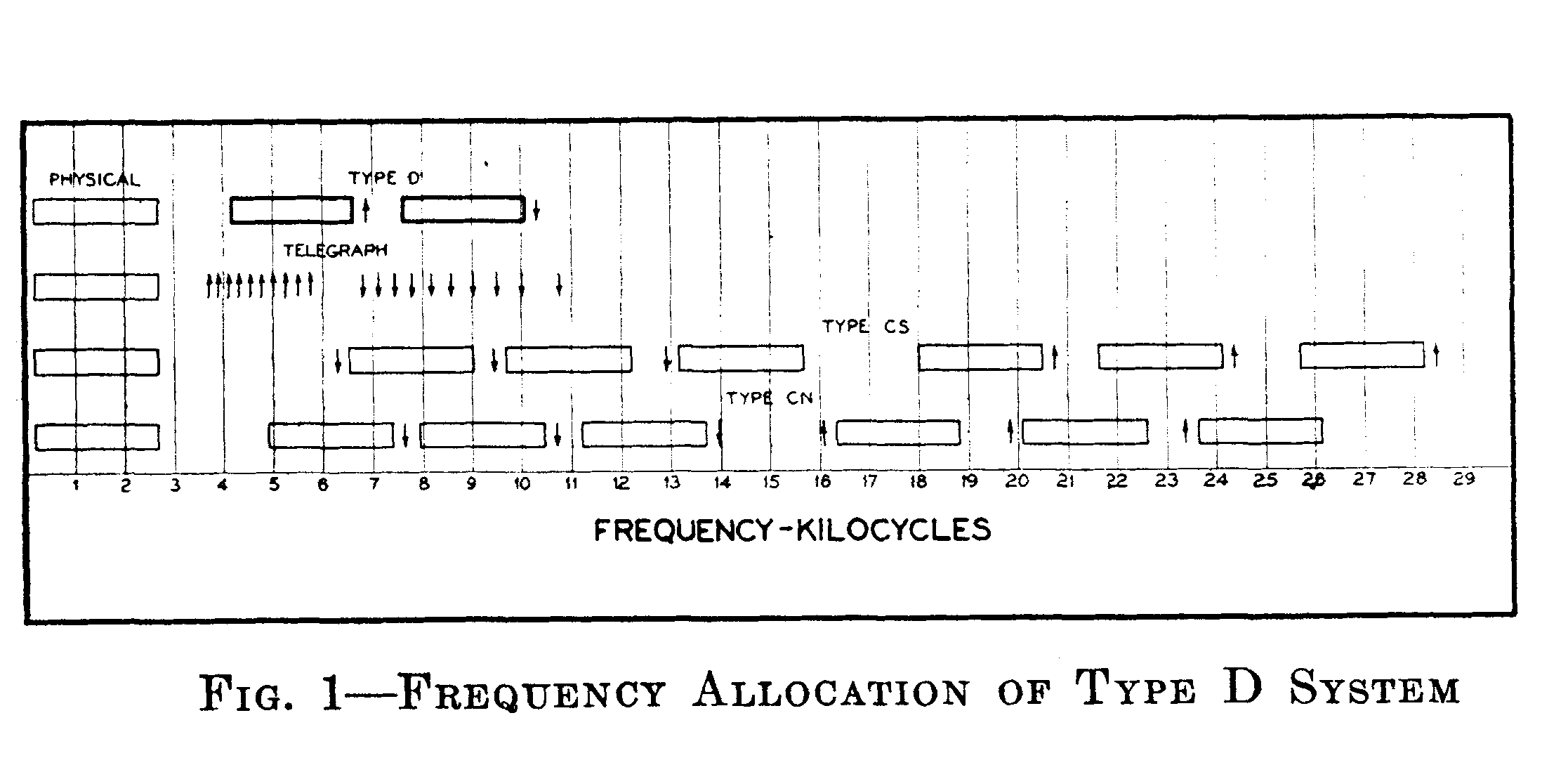
Frequency allocations for the Type D system, showing coordination with the Type C carriers and with telegraphy

Carrier telephony systems used carefully planned frequency assignments so that many telephone channels could share the same wires without objectionable crosstalk. Crosstalk occurs when signals from one circuit couple into another through the mutual inductance and capacitance between nearby wires. Depending on the severity, crosstalk could appear as faint conversations, distorted or babble speech, whistles, tones, or background noise. This was especially important on open-wire pole routes, where many circuits ran close together for hundreds of miles.

In the Type A system, three carrier channels in one direction occupied the 10 to 20 kHz band, while channels in the opposite direction occupied the 20 to 30 kHz band.

The Type C system added three carrier channels in each direction in addition to the baseband voice circuit, increasing the capacity of a line to four simultaneous bidirectional telephone conversations. The system was designed for open-wire lines, where crosstalk between adjacent pairs was significant. Because LC filters provided poorer selectivity at higher frequencies, wider spacing was used for the upper channels.

Two related frequency plans, known as CS and CN, were developed so that crosstalk between neighboring carrier systems would be less objectionable. Telephone equipment and the human ear are most sensitive to interference near 1 kHz. The CS and CN allocations were staggered so that the 1 kHz components of neighboring systems would not overlap directly. In the overlapping portions of the spectrum, opposite sidebands were used so that crosstalk appeared spectrally inverted and was less intelligible as speech. In the table, LSB and USB indicate which of the lower and upper sidebands is used. The "1 kHz image" is the frequency at which a 1 kHz voice-frequency tone appeared after modulation.

Carrier-frequency plans for the Type C CN and CS systems and the compatible Type D system
	Forward carrier (kHz)	Sideband	Frequency range of channel (kHz)	1 kHz image (kHz)	Reverse carrier (kHz)	Sideband	Frequency range of channel (kHz)	1 kHz image (kHz)
CN	7.6	LSB	7.4 – 4.9	6.6	16.1	USB	16.3 – 18.8	17.1
	10.6	LSB	10.4 – 7.9	9.6	19.9	USB	20.1 – 22.6	20.9
	14.0	LSB	13.8 – 11.3	13.0	23.4	USB	23.6 – 26.1	24.4
CS	6.3	USB	6.5 – 9.0	7.3	20.7	LSB	20.5 – 18.0	19.7
	9.5	USB	9.7 – 12.2	10.5	24.2	LSB	24.0 – 21.5	23.2
	12.9	USB	13.1 – 15.6	13.9	28.2	LSB	28.0 – 25.5	27.2
D	6.87	LSB	6.67 – 4.17	5.87	10.3	LSB	10.1 – 7.6	9.3

The Type D system was designed as a lower-cost system compatible with the CS frequency plan, but not with the alternative CN allocation.

The Ericsson open-wire system used an alternating odd-even frequency plan. All carrier frequencies were integer multiples of a 5 kHz master frequency. On a given circuit, one direction used an even multiple and the opposite direction used the adjacent odd multiple, so a three-channel span could use frequency pairs such as 10/15, 20/25, and 30/35 kHz. In the Mexican installation, Mexico City, Guadalajara, and San Luis Potosí used odd multiples as transmitting carriers, while Celaya and Vera Cruz used even multiples. The arrangement kept the two directions of each channel 5 kHz apart and allowed the same 5 kHz reference to set all carrier frequencies in the network.

During the late 1930s, Bell Laboratories standardized carrier frequencies and the 12-channel group so that open-wire, cable, and coaxial systems could use common channel equipment and be interconnected more easily. The J, K, and L systems therefore shared the same initial 60-to-108 kHz group arrangement, although each translated the group into different frequencies for transmission. Channels were spaced at 4 kHz, with carrier frequencies at multiples of 4 kHz. This tighter spacing required sharper filters than the earlier A, B, C, and D systems. The initial channel modulation stages used double-balanced modulators and crystal filters.

The Type J system, introduced in 1939, adapted the 12-channel group for open-wire lines. To reduce crosstalk between directions on the same line, west-to-east transmission used frequencies from 36 to 84 kHz while east-to-west transmission used 92 to 140 kHz. The large separation between the two bands minimized coupling between transmission directions on long open-wire routes and compatibility with the C system.

The Type K system was designed for cable transmission systems, where crosstalk was lower than on open-wire lines, but attenuation was higher because of cable capacitance and temperature sensitivity. Separate cable pairs were normally used for each transmission direction. The carrier allocations occupied the 12 to 60 kHz range and were derived from the standard 60 to 108 kHz groups by frequency translation.

The Type L systems were developed for coaxial cable transmission. Unlike open-wire and cable carrier systems, coaxial systems normally operated in one direction per cable. Five 12-channel groups were combined into a 60-channel supergroup occupying approximately 240 kHz. Higher-capacity systems were formed by additional stages of frequency translation and grouping.

The L5 system used a digitally controlled precision oscillator with a stated accuracy of 50 × 10^{−12}. It formed part of the L5 jumbogroup frequency supply, which used a digitally controlled frequency-locking loop to keep the system synchronized with the national frequency reference. When a confirmed frequency difference was detected, digital control logic stepped the oscillator setting up or down. The frequency supply was fully redundant.

=== Frequency control ===
Early carrier systems depended on the accuracy of their local carrier oscillators. In a single-sideband system, a difference between the transmitting and receiving carrier frequencies shifts the recovered speech frequencies. The Type A and Type B systems used LC oscillators. In the Type A system, which used single-sideband transmission, frequency matching between the transmitting and receiving oscillators was important because any error shifted the recovered speech frequencies. The Type B system transmitted the carrier with the sidebands, where no matching carrier was required for recovery.

The Type C system also used LC oscillators. Because the highest carrier frequency was about 30 kHz, keeping the transmitting and receiving frequencies within 20 Hz required what AT&T engineers described as an oscillator "of exceptional stability". The Type D system used an LC oscillator, but reduced tube count by combining the oscillator and modulator functions. Its two mixer tubes operated in parallel as the oscillator and differentially as the balanced modulator.

Bell called the generation of the carriers the "carrier supply". The later J, K, and L systems used a more systematic approach to generating the carrier supply. Channel carrier frequencies were derived from a common 4 kHz source and multiplier chains, so that all channel translations were tied to one reference. The 4k signal was passed through a symmetric pulse generator to create odd harmonics, and a bridge rectifier to produce even harmonics. Needed harmonics were separated with narrow band filters. In the Type J open-wire and Type K cable systems, the reference oscillator used a tuning fork. This was accurate enough for the lower carrier frequencies used in those systems.

The Type L coaxial system used a different arrangement because its higher carrier frequencies required closer frequency agreement between terminals. Its frequency supply was based on crystal-controlled oscillators and a frequency-controlled loop. The adjustable oscillator was not a voltage-controlled oscillator in the later electronic sense, but a motor-controlled oscillator in which a motor drove a variable capacitor to keep the frequency locked to the reference.

=== Modulation ===
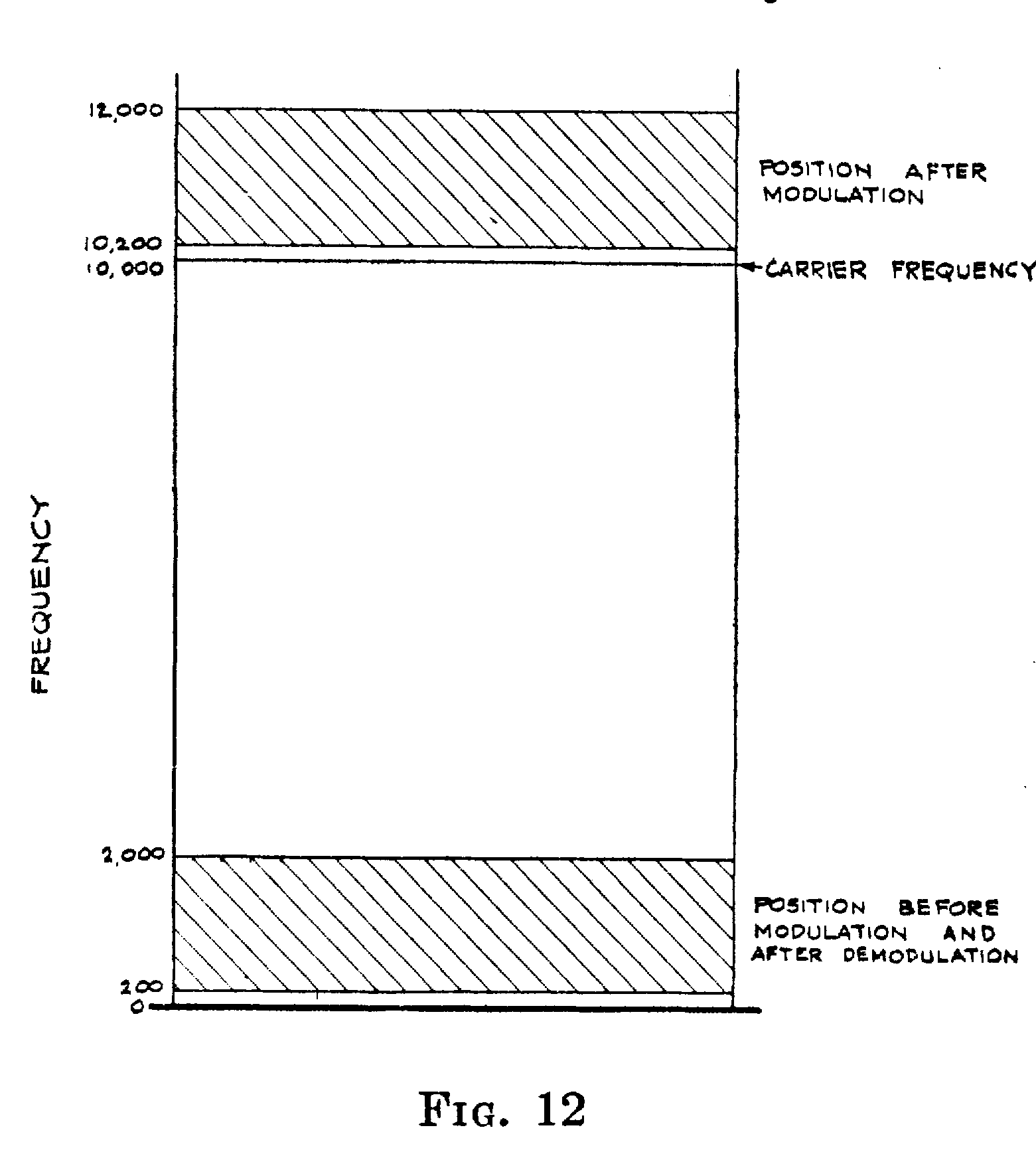
Example of frequency translation from 1921 Colpitts paper

In the Type D system, two triodes built both the local oscillator and the mixer. The two tubes operated in parallel for the oscillator, and differentially for the single-balanced mixer. This reduced cost and power dissipation. A terminal unit used 5 triodes, 2 for each frequency converter, and one for the ringer circuit.

The Ericsson system used a different modulator arrangement from the carrier-suppressing balanced modulator. Sterky described a two-valve "compound modulator" in which the valve anodes were connected in parallel and the grids were driven in push-pull. A compensating voltage from the common anode circuit was fed back to the grids to reduce the effect of the anode load on the grid circuit, making the resulting anode-current characteristic approximately square-law. With the carrier and speech voltages applied together, the anode circuit produced sum and difference frequencies; the following band filter selected the upper sideband. Although the circuit could be adjusted to suppress the carrier, the Mexican system deliberately transmitted the carrier along with the upper sideband, simplifying the receiving terminal.

The initial signal modulation to form the groups was identical in the J, K and L systems, and was based on double-balanced mixers made with copper oxide rectifiers and crystal filters. This stratagy remained in place through the 1974 design. The 12 signals are first translated to a band from 60 to 108 kHz, where as a group, they were then translated to the final frequency as needed. The systems all operated from a master, 4 kHz frequency reference, and a frequency multiplier system to synthesize all of the needed carriers. In the J and K systems, the oscillators were open loop, using tuning forks for frequency references. In the L system, given the high accuracy requirements for the greater frequencies involved (.25 ppm relative accuracy between the two terminals), crystal oscillators with a frequency-locked loop were used. The variable frequency oscillator was implemented with a motor driving a variable capacitor.

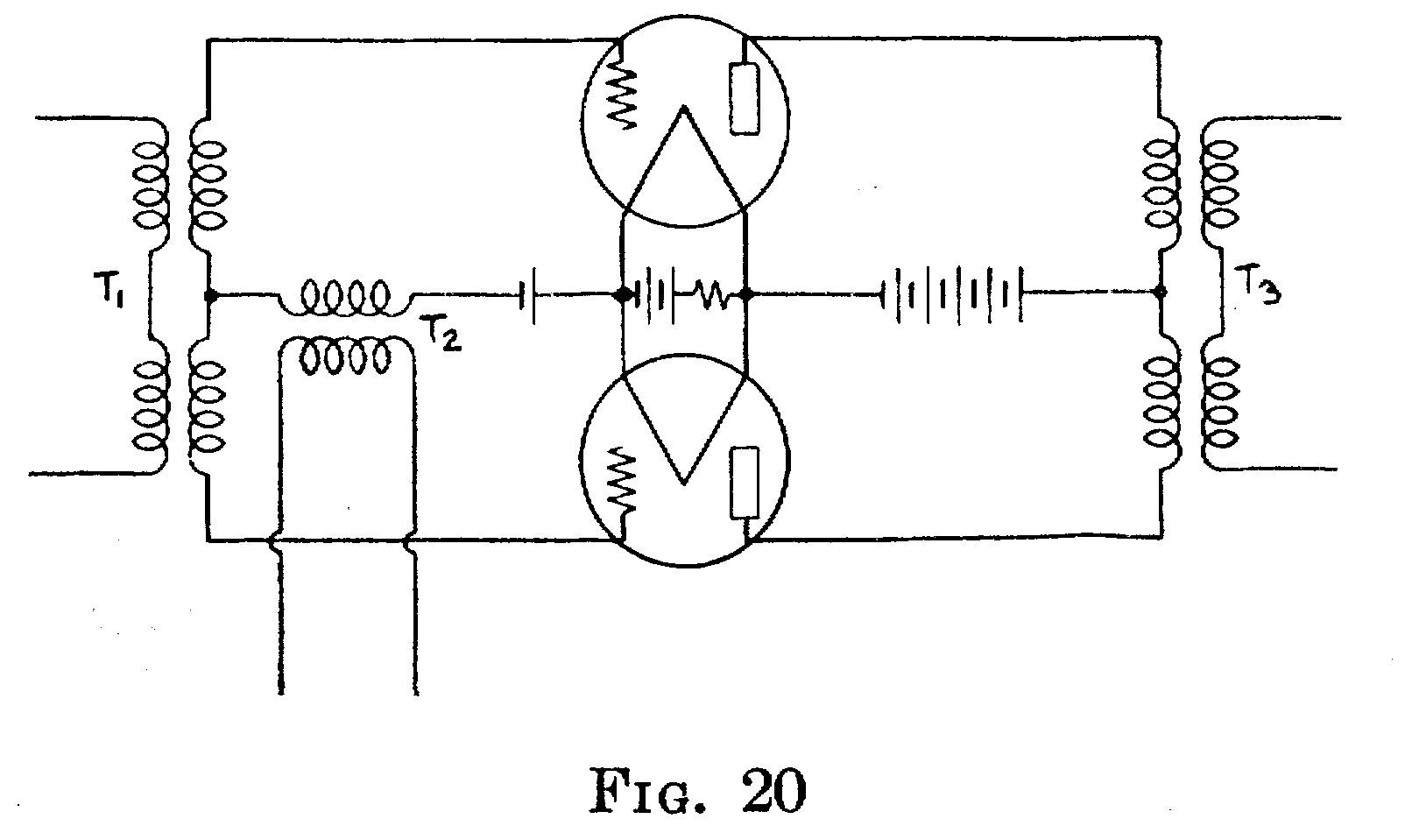
Single balanced mixer used in 1921 carrier systems

The Type-42 system first translated all 48 input signals, each occupying 200–3600 Hz, to 7800–4400 Hz by mixing with an 8 kHz oscillator and selecting the lower sideband. Each signal was then translated to its final frequency and combined with the other signals. This two-step method simplified filtering, requiring only LC filters. The hardware for each 12-channel group is separate, giving redundancy for reliability.

=== Amplification ===
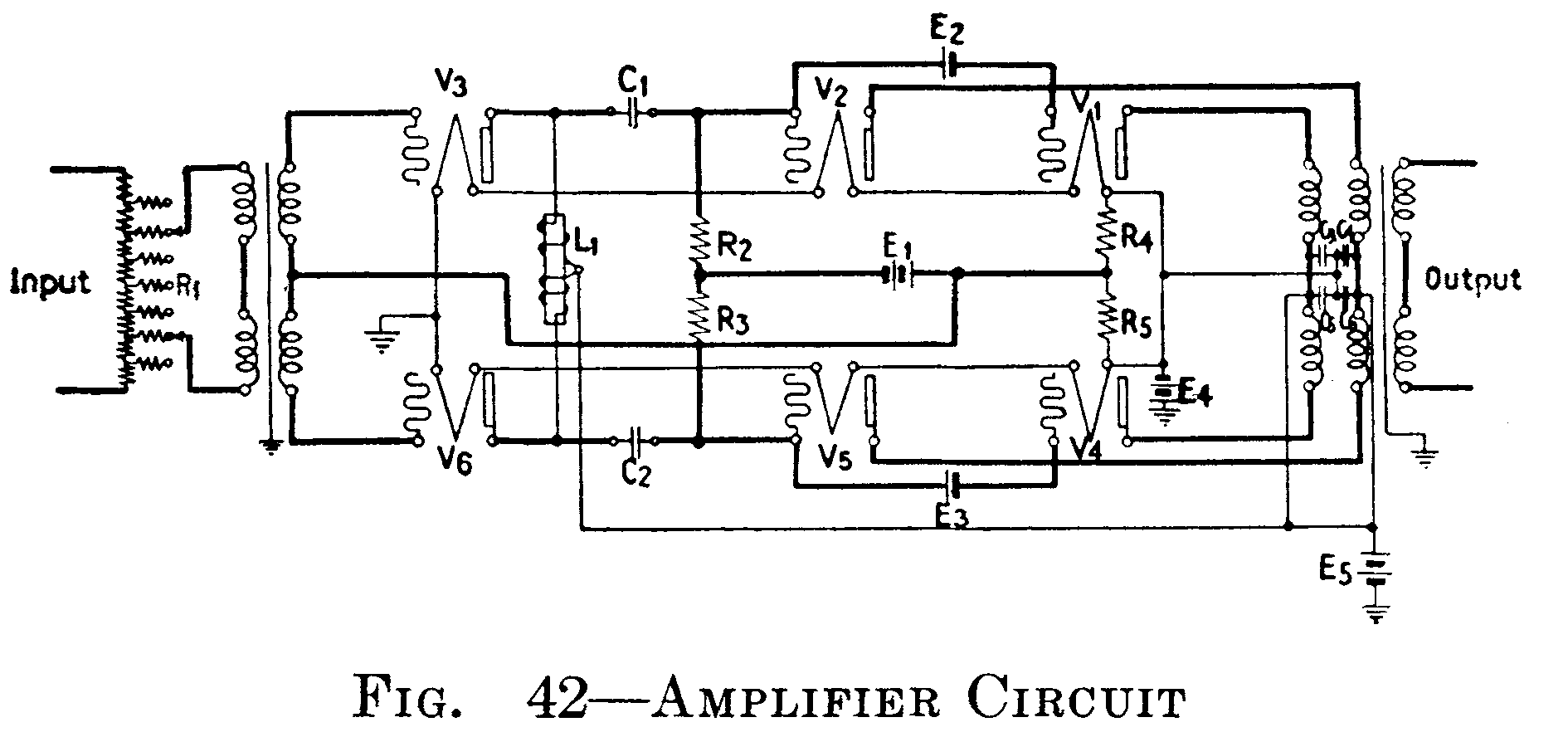
Type C push-pull amplifier. Used for both the repeater and the terminal equipment.

The Type C system used the same amplifier design in both terminal equipment and line repeaters. Low second-harmonic distortion was important because harmonics generated in the lower-frequency bands could fall inside higher-frequency carrier channels. A balanced push-pull circuit reduced second-harmonic distortion by approximately 15 to 20 dB. Although balanced amplifiers theoretically cancelled even-order harmonics completely, practical vacuum tubes rarely matched closely enough for perfect cancellation. Harold Black later described these limitations as one of the factors that motivated his work on negative-feedback amplifiers.

The Type D system usually operated without dedicated repeaters, since the modulators themselves provided enough gain for shorter routes. For lines longer than about 125 miles, a two-triode push-pull repeater amplifier was used.

In 1929, Harold Black applied for a patent on the negative-feedback amplifier. The circuit was designed to allow carrier systems to have a span of up to 4000 miles.

Black demonstrated that an amplifier using a feedback network matched to the loss characteristics of a cable could compensate for transmission loss while maintaining stable gain. In the Morristown carrier telephony trials, 29 such amplifiers were operated in tandem over long-distance test circuits. The mathematical theory of feedback stability was later developed further by Hendrik Bode and Harry Nyquist.

Black's negative-feedback amplifier was later recognized as a major enabling technology for wideband carrier systems. In remarks quoted when Black received the 1957 Lamme Medal, Mervin Kelly of Bell Laboratories described the invention as "one of the two inventions" of broadest importance in electronics and communications during the preceding half-century. Kelly linked it directly to the feasibility of long-distance telephone, television, and transoceanic cable networks.

Negative feedback became important in carrier repeaters because many voice channels were amplified together. Terman described its use in telephone repeaters as a way to stabilize gain and reduce distortion and cross modulation. Stable gain was especially important on long toll circuits containing many repeaters, while reduced cross modulation helped prevent one carrier channel from interfering with another in the same amplifier.

In the late-1930s Type K cable systems, repeater amplifiers were spaced about 17 miles apart. The repeaters used cascaded pentode amplifiers with negative feedback networks chosen to match the characteristics of cable types and lengths. By placing a simulated cable network in the feedback path, the combined amplifier-and-cable response could be made nearly uniform over the transmission band. Because cable loss varied with temperature, automatic gain regulation was provided using a pilot tone transmitted through another dedicated wire pair on the cable together with a motor-driven variable capacitor in the feedback network. The Type J open-wire system used similar pilot-tone regulation techniques, although the pilot frequency was transmitted on the same wire pair as the carrier channels, because an extra open-wire pair for the pilot was impractical.

A revised K2 system entered service during World War II and was described publicly in 1947. By that time approximately 250,000 miles each of K1 and K2 circuits were in operation, using roughly 30,000 negative-feedback repeaters. The K2 system used embedded pilot tones and variable-gain amplifiers employing thermistors and heaters as control elements. Both positive and negative feedback were used in the regulating circuits.

As the Type L coaxial systems evolved, wider bandwidths made the line loss higher and more frequency-dependent. Repeaters therefore had to be spaced more closely, while their amplifiers required more precise gain shaping and automatic regulation.

Selected characteristics of successive Bell System L-carrier systems
	L1 1941	L3 1957	L4 1967	L5 1974	L5E Late 1970s
Repeater spacing	8 miles	4 miles	2 miles	1 mile	1 mile
Two-way telephone circuits per coax pair	600	1,860	3,600	10,800	13,200
Amplifier technology	Vacuum tube	Vacuum tube	Transistor	Thin-film hybrid IC	Thin-film hybrid IC
Maximum signal frequency	2.5 MHz	8.32 MHz	17.5 MHz	66.5 MHz	64.8 MHz

The L3 amplifier was described in 1953. It used two amplifier stages with tubes designed for coaxial carrier service. The repeater operated to about 8 MHz and supplied gain shaped to match coaxial cable loss, from about 10 dB at low frequencies to about 45 dB at 8 MHz. Negative-feedback networks were used both to shape the gain and to match the input and output impedances of the cable. A regulating stage between the two amplifier stages used a thermistor/heater combination to track changes in cable loss with temperature. The equalization and feedback design drew on network theory developed by H. W. Bode and Sidney Darlington.

The L4 coaxial system extended the line bandwidth to 20 MHz. Its repeaters used solid-state amplifiers spaced at 2-mile intervals on routes up to about 4,000 miles. The regulating system followed the same general approach as the L3 vacuum-tube system, using thermistors as control elements.

The L5 system increased the useful bandwidth to more than 60 MHz and reduced repeater spacing to about 1 mile. Its solid-state repeaters used highly linear transistor circuits, with parallel matched transistors used to reduce distortion. Gain regulation again used thermistor control elements, while the implementation used thin-film hybrid construction. The L5 repeatered line used 28 bands of frequency equalization, each adjusted by an equalizer based on Bode's method.

=== Filter development ===
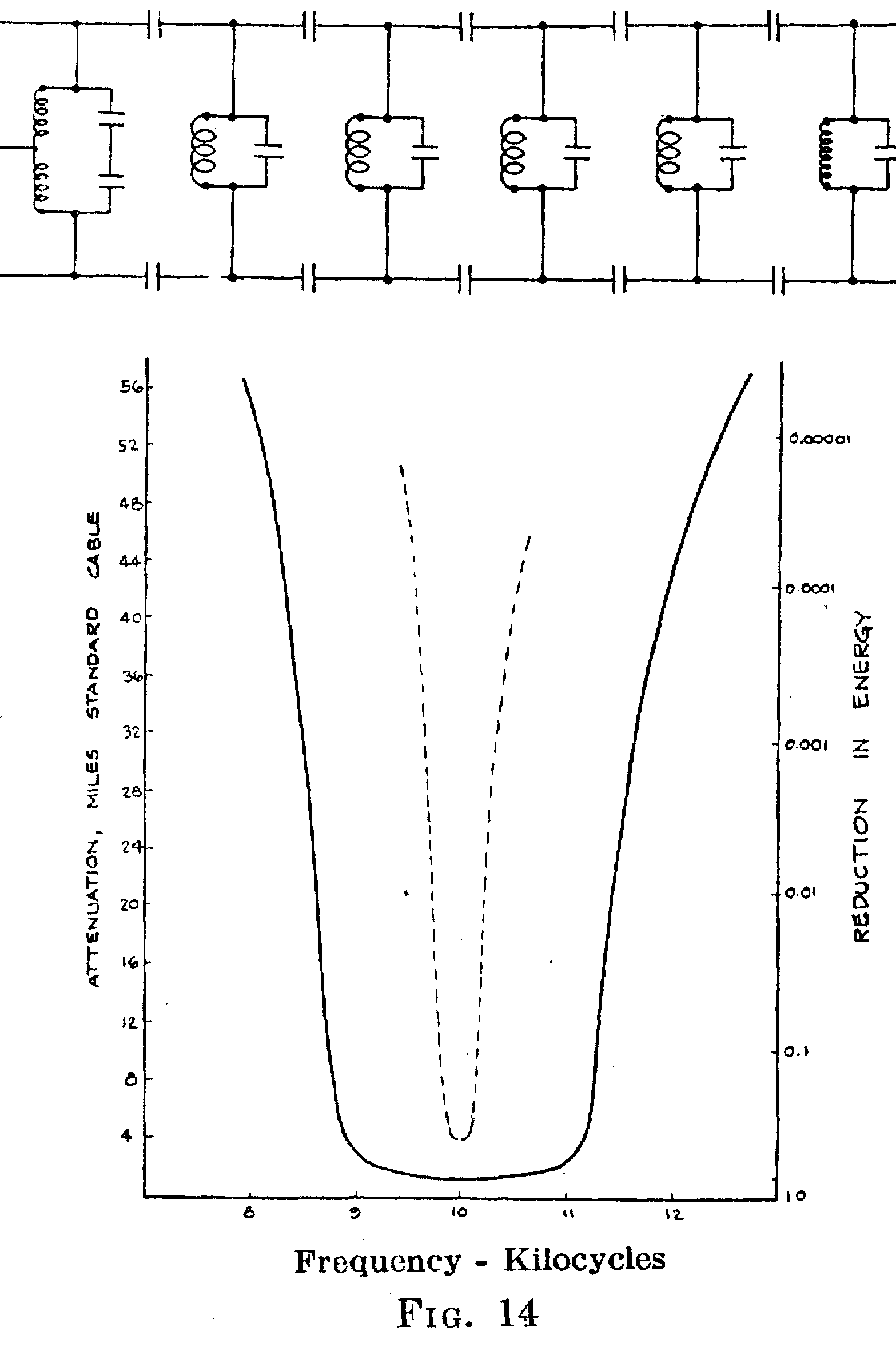
LC filter for carrier telephony. Solid line shows attenuation matching schematic, dashed line shows simple coupled LC network.

The development of carrier telephony systems was a major driver in the advancement of electrical wave filter theory and selective filter design during the early 20th century. George Campbell described the theory and practical construction of electric wave filters in a 1922 paper in the Bell System Technical Journal. Campbell described both ladder and lattice filter structures for separating signals by frequency, using networks of inductors and capacitors (LC). Otto Zobel and K. S. Johnson expanded on these efforts. These filters became standard components in Bell System carrier telephony equipment, including the channel filters used in the Type A through D carrier systems.

In 1922, Walter Cady proposed the use of quartz resonators as filter elements. Building on this work, W. P. Mason developed crystal lattice filter networks for Bell System carrier telephony applications. Mason's wideband lattice filters provided much sharper selectivity than earlier LC filters. The lattice configuration used complementary network arms to produce cancellation outside the passband while maintaining transmission within the desired channel group, allowing sharply selective channel filters suitable for 12-channel carrier systems operating from 60 to 108 kHz.

The sharp cutoff characteristics of crystal lattice filters made 4 kHz channel spacing practical and economical in large carrier systems. The standard 60 to 108 kHz group band was influenced by the practical frequency range of early crystal filters. In many carrier systems, voice channels were first translated into this band for filtering and grouping, then shifted again to the higher frequencies used on open-wire, cable, or coaxial systems. The J, K, and L systems mainly differed in these later frequency translations and higher-level grouping arrangements.

Similar work took place in the United Kingdom, where Post Office engineers developed crystal channel filters for carrier telephony systems based on the same lattice and quartz-resonator techniques pioneered at Bell Laboratories.

In 1946, Bell Laboratories introduced a redesigned crystal channel filter using eight crystal elements in a single lattice structure, reducing the size and weight of earlier filter assemblies.

Lower-cost short-haul carrier systems, such as the Bell System Type N carriers, returned to LC filters and double-sideband modulation. Eliminating single-sideband channel filters reduced equipment cost and complexity, while the wider 8 kHz channel spacing allowed the use of simpler filters in the receiving end. These compromises were practical for shorter-distance systems where spectrum efficiency was less important than equipment cost.

In the late 1960s and early 1970s, Bell Laboratories developed monolithic crystal filters for carrier telephony channel banks, including the A6 channel bank system. These designs replaced earlier discrete lattice crystal filter assemblies that had been used for more than 40 years. In these systems, voice channels were translated to frequencies above 8 MHz using 4 kHz spacing then combined and translated into the standard 60 to 108 kHz carrier group. The compact monolithic filters reduced the size and cost limitations that had previously restricted widespread use of crystal channel filters.

Other manufacturers developed related technologies. Lenkurt's 60-channel carrier systems used polylithic crystal filters for compact multiplex equipment.

=== Semiconductor systems ===
In the N2 system, the input amplifiers were constructed with PNP germanium transistors, and silicon NPN transistors were used for the output stages (both transistors are types of bipolar junction transistors). The silicon transistor was developed specifically for this design to permit high-power operation at elevated temperatures. The compressor and expander, used to increase dynamic range and reduce noise, required the development of a special diode to be used as a variable resistance, termed a "variolosser". They were designed to CCITT recommendations.

The N2 double-sideband frequency conversion was accomplished with a square-wave crystal oscillator driving an NPN switch-type unbalanced mixer. In the N3 system, 24 channels were modulated at 4 kHz intervals into a 96 kHz band from either 36–132 kHz or 172–268 kHz. A phase-locked loop corrected for any frequency drift between the modulation and demodulation oscillators.

The mixers were single-balanced transistor modulators, built with a germanium transistor designed specifically for this circuit, having high reverse gain. Crystal filters were used, providing an audio bandwidth of 200–3450 Hz.

Given the extreme linearity requirements of up to 4000 cascaded amplifiers, ultralinear transistors were developed for the L5 system.

=== 12-channel channel banks ===
The Bell System and the CCITT standardized the basic analog frequency-division multiplexing group as twelve voice channels occupying the band from 60 to 108 kHz. The same final group band could be produced in several ways, depending on the filter technology used in the channel bank. The most selective filters were the individual channel filters, since they had to separate adjacent voice channels spaced only 4 kHz apart.

The 12-channel arrangement was formalized internationally in CCITT Recommendation G.232, which specified 12-channel translating equipment for carrier systems.

Different national systems used different translating arrangements. Some European and Japanese channel banks used LC single-sideband filters by first translating three channels into the 12 to 24 kHz range, then combining four such groups into the standard 60 to 108 kHz band. Other systems in Europe, the United States, and Japan first translated each voice channel to the 48 to 52 kHz range before shifting the channels into the group band. In the United States and Great Britain, some channel banks used direct modulation into the 60 to 108 kHz band, with twelve LC, crystal, or mechanical channel filters operating in parallel. European mechanical-filter systems could instead use an intermediate range around 200 to 204 kHz before final translation to 60 to 108 kHz.

The Bell System A1 through A5 channel banks used direct modulation into the 60 to 108 kHz group band. The later A6 channel bank used an intermediate frequency above 8 MHz so that monolithic crystal filters could be used before the completed group was translated down to the standard 60 to 108 kHz band.

=== A-type channel banks ===
The Bell System A-type channel banks translated individual voice circuits to and from the standard 12-channel group occupying 60 to 108 kHz. These banks provided the channel modulation, demodulation, filtering, and level control used with the J, K, L, and later broadband carrier systems. The first A-type channel banks were developed for open-wire, cable, and coaxial carrier systems; later versions were also used with microwave transmission systems such as TD-2 and related Bell System radio relay equipment.

A-type channel bank development
	A1	A2	A3	A4	A5	A6
Channels per equipment bay	18	24	24	38	108–120	—
Year	1934	—	—	1944	1962	1972
Gain element	Vacuum tube	Vacuum tube	Vacuum tube	Vacuum tube	PNP germanium transistor	Silicon NPN transistor integrated circuits
Modulator	Copper oxide	Copper oxide	Copper oxide	Copper oxide	Copper oxide	Two-transistor balanced modulator
Filter	Two-stage crystal lattice	Two-stage crystal lattice	Two-stage crystal lattice	One-stage lattice	One-stage lattice	Monolithic crystal
Conversion method	Direct, one-stage	Direct, one-stage	Direct, one-stage	Direct, one-stage	Direct, one-stage	Two-stage, with intermediate conversion above 8 MHz

The A5 channel bank, introduced in the early 1960s, was a transistorized replacement for earlier vacuum-tube channel banks. Bell System authors described it as a "radically new version" of the A-type bank. Its transmitting path used passive copper-oxide modulator bridges and crystal filters, with the twelve channel units operating in parallel. The receiving path used a crystal filter, copper-oxide demodulator bridge, and a three-transistor negative-feedback voice amplifier with low-frequency equalization to compensate for channel-filter roll-off near the lower edge of the voice band. Compared with the A4 bank, the A5 bank reduced size and power requirements while improving operating characteristics.

The A6 channel bank, described in 1972, used a two-stage conversion system with an intermediate frequency above 8 MHz, since monolithic crystal filters were practical only above about 5 MHz. This allowed the earlier multi-crystal lattice filters to be replaced by monolithic crystal filters, in which several mechanically coupled resonators were formed in a single small quartz element. The filters remained electromechanical devices but were much smaller and better suited to manufacture than assemblies built from several separate crystal units. The A6 bank also used thin-film hybrid circuits and silicon integrated circuitry.

=== Supergroup and mastergroup multiplexing ===
High-capacity carrier systems combined 12-channel groups into larger multiplexing structures. This was used in Type L coaxial systems and in microwave radio-relay systems such as TD-2, TH, TJ, and TL, where a single transmission path carried far more than one 12-channel group.

In the Bell System L600 multiplex equipment, five 12-channel groups were first combined into a 60-channel supergroup occupying 312 to 552 kHz, a bandwidth of 240 kHz. Ten supergroups were then combined to form a 600-channel mastergroup. The mastergroup occupied the band from 60 to 2788 kHz; the difference between the ten 240 kHz supergroups and the full mastergroup band provided guard spaces. The resulting 600-channel structure was compatible with the CCITT multiplex hierarchy.

The L1860 terminal extended the same hierarchy by translating 31 supergroups into the band from approximately 312 kHz to 8284 kHz.

Pilot tones were transmitted at 92 kHz with each of the groups and were used to regulate transmission levels through the system.

== Transition to digital transmission ==
Beginning in the 1960s, digital systems started to replace analog frequency-division systems. The Bell System's T1 system carried 24 voice channels over two cable pairs using pulse-code modulation and time-division multiplexing. Instead of assigning each conversation a separate frequency band, it sampled the 24 channels in sequence and combined their binary digital values into a single digital bit stream. Line repeaters regenerated the pulses rather than amplifying the received waveform, preventing noise and distortion from accumulating in the same manner as in analog carrier systems.

Western Electric began manufacturing T1 equipment in 1962, and by 1965 about 100,000 T1 voice channels were in Bell System service. Digital carrier systems retained the use of channel banks, repeatered line sections, alarms, and standardized multiplexing hierarchies, but represented the telephone signals as timed digital codes rather than continuously varying frequencies and amplitudes.
