= Off-air pickup =

An off-air pickup or off-the-air pickup is a method by which the direct signal from a radio or television station is received and then rebroadcast by another station, CATV system, or satellite television feed. It was often used to distribute network broadcast programming to smaller markets which were normally outside of the range of major centers.

== Use in United States television ==
In the 1950s, a broadband network of AT&T L-carrier and microwave relays known as Long Lines was constructed. These circuits could be (and were) used for normal telephone traffic, but were also used to relay the video signals of the three US commercial television networks (ABC, CBS, and NBC) to their various affiliated stations around the country. This enabled those affiliates to all carry network programming "live" at the same time.

However, a handful of small-market TV stations were not able to be connected via long lines due to their remote geographic location. In some cases, network shows were recorded (either as a kinescope or, starting in the late 1950s and early 1960s, on videotape) and sent to the station via mail or courier, to be aired on a delayed basis (usually a one-week delay). This was a less than satisfactory situation for these stations because of the inferior quality of kinescope recordings, the possibility of a recording being lost or damaged in transit, and the fact that they would be unable to broadcast episodes of a given series on the same date and at the same time as most other network affiliates. Additionally, live broadcasts such as sporting events and breaking news coverage could not be carried, as they would be dated by the time a recording could be received and broadcast.

Some of these stations, therefore, entered into an agreement with another affiliate of the same network located in a nearby market to pick up their broadcast signal off the air and relay it via their own transmitter during network programming. In most cases, this was accomplished by simply placing a high-gain directional antenna on their broadcast tower, aimed at the relaying station. (Although, in a few situations, a private microwave relay system was established).

While avoiding the problems of depending on delayed recordings, this method was not without its own inherent pitfalls. As the originating station was usually somewhat—as far as 50–100 miles (80–160 km) or more—the signal could frequently be degraded or interfered with by other stations on the same channel during periods of ionospheric or tropospheric disturbance. For that matter, if the originating station experienced technical difficulties and had to leave the air, the receiving station would be left without network programming during the outage as well.

Additionally, during network breaks when local commercials and station identifications were aired, the receiving station would have to cut away from their off-air network feed to substitute their own local material. This was often accomplished without cues, merely by having the master control operator monitor the feed, prepared to "punch up" the local inserts when appropriate. But this required very careful timing, and often a bit of the originating station's commercials or station identification would mistakenly be rebroadcast by the receiving station. Also, if there was a local pre-emption either due to breaking news or a pre-planned pre-emption of the network on the originating station, the other station would have to scramble to find alternate programming to carry during the pre-emption, either by asking the network for film of a program in advance, picking it up from yet another station, or substituting programming from their archives.

Although most of these affiliates were eventually connected to the "live" network via new extensions or branches of the Long Lines system, some of these off-air network pickups were still used well into the 1970s. In 1977, 12 NBC affiliates received all network services from direct off-air pickup of another station. Eventually, during the 1980s, the U.S. networks began distributing their programming via communications satellite, enabling any affiliate to erect a dish and have a reliable source for their network feed.

== See also ==
- broadcast relay station
