= Carrier wave =

Sinusoidal wave without any modulation

The frequency spectrum of a typical radio signal from an AM or FM radio transmitter. The horizontal axis is frequency; the vertical axis is signal amplitude or power. It consists of a signal (C) at the carrier wave frequency f_{C}, with the modulation contained in narrow frequency bands called sidebands (SB) just above and below the carrier. The entire signal range is the bandwidth (BW).

In telecommunications, a carrier wave, carrier signal, or just carrier, is a periodic waveform (usually sinusoidal) that conveys information through a process called modulation. One or more of the wave's properties, such as amplitude or frequency, are modified by an information-bearing signal, called the message signal or modulation signal. The carrier frequency is usually much higher than the message signal frequency because it is usually impractical to transmit signals with low frequencies due to larger wavelength than antenna size.

The purpose of the carrier is usually either to transmit the information through space as an electromagnetic wave (as in radio communication), or to allow several carriers at different frequencies to share a common physical transmission medium by frequency division multiplexing (as in a cable television system).

The term originated in radio communication, where the carrier wave creates the waves which carry the information (modulation) through the air from the transmitter to the receiver. The term is also used for an unmodulated emission in the absence of any modulating signal.

In music production, carrier signals can be controlled by a modulating signal to change the sound property of an audio recording and add a sense of depth and movement.

== Overview ==
The term carrier wave originated with radio. In a radio communication system, such as radio or television broadcasting, information is transmitted across space by radio waves. At the sending end, the information, in the form of a modulation signal, is applied to an electronic device called a transmitter. In the transmitter, an electronic oscillator generates a sinusoidal alternating current of radio frequency; this is the carrier wave. The information signal is used to modulate the carrier wave, altering some aspects of the carrier, to impress the information on the wave. The alternating current is amplified and applied to the transmitter's antenna, radiating radio waves that carry the information to the receiver's location. At the receiver, the radio waves strike the receiver's antenna, inducing a tiny oscillating current in it, which is applied to the receiver. In the receiver, the modulation signal is extracted from the modulated carrier wave, a process called demodulation.

Most radio systems in the 20th century used frequency modulation (FM) or amplitude modulation (AM) to add information to the carrier. The frequency spectrum of a modulated AM or FM signal from a radio transmitter is shown above. It consists of a strong component (C) at the carrier frequency $f_C$ with the modulation contained in narrow sidebands (SB) above and below the carrier frequency. The frequency of a radio or television station is considered to be the carrier frequency. However the carrier itself is not useful in transmitting the information, so the energy in the carrier component is a waste of transmitter power. Therefore, in many modern modulation methods, the carrier is not transmitted. For example, in single-sideband modulation (SSB), the carrier is suppressed (and in some forms of SSB, eliminated). The carrier must be reintroduced at the receiver by a beat frequency oscillator (BFO).

However the carrier itself is not useful in transmitting the information, so the energy in the carrier component is a waste of transmitter power. Therefore, in many modern modulation methods, the carrier is not transmitted. This particluar phrase though usually correct is not correct when the mode of transmission is Morse Code or what radio operators call CW. In this case that carrier wave becomes the mode of carrying the intelligence from the transmitter to the receiver unit.

Carriers are also widely used to transmit multiple information channels through a single cable or other communication medium using the technique of frequency division multiplexing (FDM). Early telephony systems increased capacity by communicating on multiple carries. For example, in a cable television system, hundreds of television channels are distributed to consumers through a single coaxial cable, by modulating each television channel on a carrier wave of a different frequency, then sending all the carriers through the cable. At the receiver, the individual channels can be separated by bandpass filters using tuned circuits so the television channel desired can be displayed. A similar technique called wavelength division multiplexing is used to transmit multiple channels of data through an optical fiber by modulating them on separate light carriers; light beams of different wavelengths.

== Carrierless modulation systems ==
The information in a modulated radio signal is contained in the sidebands while the power in the carrier frequency component does not transmit information itself, so newer forms of radio communication (such as spread spectrum and ultra-wideband), and OFDM which is widely used in Wi-Fi networks, digital television, and digital audio broadcasting (DAB) do not use a conventional sinusoidal carrier wave.

== Carrier leakage ==
Carrier leakage is interference caused by crosstalk or a DC offset. It is present as an unmodulated sine wave within the signal's bandwidth, whose amplitude is independent of the signal's amplitude. See frequency mixers.

== See also ==
- Carrier-to-noise ratio
- Carrier recovery
- Carrier system
- Carrier tone
- Frequency-division multiplexing
- Sideband
