= William Shieh =

Australian electrical engineer

William Shieh (#333) is an electrical engineer at the University of Melbourne in Glen Waverley, Victoria, Australia. He was named a Fellow of the Institute of Electrical and Electronics Engineers in 2013 for his contributions to coherent optical orthogonal frequency-division multiplexing. He was also made a Fellow of the Optical Society.
