= Frequency-division multiplexing =

Signal processing technique in telecommunications

In telecommunications, frequency-division multiplexing (FDM) is a technique by which the total bandwidth available in a communication medium is divided into a series of non-overlapping frequency bands, each of which is used to carry a separate signal. This allows a single transmission medium such as a microwave radio link, cable or optical fiber to be shared by multiple independent signals. Another use is to carry separate serial bits or segments of a higher rate signal in parallel.

The most common example of frequency-division multiplexing is radio and television broadcasting, in which multiple radio signals at different frequencies pass through the air at the same time. Another example is cable television, in which many television channels are carried simultaneously on a single cable. FDM is also used by telephone systems to transmit multiple telephone calls through high-capacity trunk lines (carrier telephony), communications satellites to transmit multiple channels of data on uplink and downlink radio beams, and broadband DSL modems to transmit large amounts of computer data through twisted pair telephone lines, among many other uses.

An analogous technique called wavelength division multiplexing is used in fiber-optic communication, in which multiple channels of data are transmitted over a single optical fiber using different wavelengths (frequencies).

== Principle ==
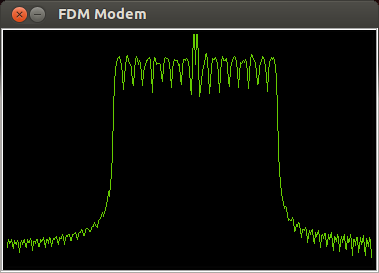
The passband of an FDM channel carrying digital data, modulated by QPSK quadrature phase-shift keying

The multiple separate information (modulation) signals that are sent over an FDM system, such as the video signals of the television channels that are sent over a cable TV system, are called baseband signals. At the source end, for each frequency channel, an electronic oscillator generates a carrier signal, a steady oscillating waveform at a single frequency that serves to "carry" information. The carrier is much higher in frequency than the baseband signal. The carrier signal and the baseband signal are combined in a modulator circuit. The modulator alters some aspect of the carrier signal, such as its amplitude, frequency, or phase, with the baseband signal, "piggybacking" the data onto the carrier.

The result of modulating (mixing) the carrier with the baseband signal is to generate sub-frequencies near the carrier frequency, at the sum (f_{C} + f_{B}) and difference (f_{C} − f_{B}) of the frequencies. The information from the modulated signal is carried in sidebands on each side of the carrier frequency. Therefore, all the information carried by the channel is in a narrow band of frequencies clustered around the carrier frequency, this is called the passband of the channel.

Similarly, additional baseband signals are used to modulate carriers at other frequencies, creating other channels of information. The carriers are spaced far enough apart in frequency that the band of frequencies occupied by each channel, the passbands of the separate channels, do not overlap. All the channels are sent through the transmission medium, such as a coaxial cable, optical fiber, or through the air using a radio transmitter. As long as the channel frequencies are spaced far enough apart that none of the passbands overlap, the separate channels will not interfere with each other. Thus the available bandwidth is divided into "slots" or channels, each of which can carry a separate modulated signal.

For example, the coaxial cable used by cable television systems has a bandwidth of about 1000 MHz, but the passband of each television channel is only 6 MHz wide, so there is room for many channels on the cable (in modern digital cable systems each channel in turn is subdivided into subchannels and can carry up to 10 digital television channels).

At the destination end of the cable or fiber, or the radio receiver, for each channel a local oscillator produces a signal at the carrier frequency of that channel, that is mixed with the incoming modulated signal. The frequencies subtract, producing the baseband signal for that channel again. This is called demodulation. The resulting baseband signal is filtered out of the other frequencies and output to the user.

== Telephone ==
For long distance telephone connections, 20th century telephone companies used L-carrier and similar coaxial cable systems carrying thousands of voice circuits multiplexed in multiple stages by channel banks.

For shorter distances, cheaper balanced pair cables were used for various systems including Bell System K- and N-Carrier. Those cables did not allow such large bandwidths, so only 12 voice channels (double sideband) and later 24 (single sideband) were multiplexed into four wires, one pair for each direction with repeaters every several miles, approximately 10 km. See carrier telephony. By the end of the 20th century, FDM voice circuits had become rare. Modern telephone systems employ digital transmission, in which time-division multiplexing (TDM) is used instead of FDM.

Since the late 20th century, digital subscriber lines (DSL) have used a Discrete multitone (DMT) system to divide their spectrum into frequency channels.

=== Group and supergroup ===
A once commonplace FDM system, used for example in L-carrier, uses crystal filters which operate at the 8 MHz range to form a Channel Group of 12 channels, 48 kHz bandwidth in the range 8140 to 8188 kHz by selecting carriers in the range 8140 to 8184 kHz selecting upper sideband this group can then be translated to the standard range 60 to 108 kHz by a carrier of 8248 kHz. Such systems are used in DTL (Direct To Line) and DFSG (Directly formed super group).

132 voice channels (2SG + 1G) can be formed using DTL plane the modulation and frequency plan are given in FIG1 and FIG2 use of DTL technique allows the formation of a maximum of 132 voice channels that can be placed direct to line. DTL eliminates group and super group equipment.

DFSG can take similar steps where a direct formation of a number of super groups can be obtained in the 8 kHz the DFSG also eliminates group equipment and can offer:

- Reduction in cost 7% to 13%
- Less equipment to install and maintain
- Increased reliability due to less equipment

Both DTL and DFSG can fit the requirement of low density system (using DTL) and higher density system (using DFSG). The DFSG terminal is similar to DTL terminal except instead of two super groups many super groups are combined. A Mastergroup of 600 channels (10 super-groups) is an example based on DFSG.

== Other examples ==
FDM can also be used to combine signals before final modulation onto a carrier wave. In this case the carrier signals are referred to as subcarriers: an example is stereo FM transmission, where a 38 kHz subcarrier is used to separate the left-right difference signal from the central left-right sum channel, prior to the frequency modulation of the composite signal. An analog NTSC television channel is divided into subcarrier frequencies for video, color, and audio. DSL uses different frequencies for voice and for upstream and downstream data transmission on the same conductors, which is also an example of frequency duplex.

Where frequency-division multiplexing is used as to allow multiple users to share a physical communications channel, it is called frequency-division multiple access (FDMA).

FDMA is the traditional way of separating radio signals from different transmitters.

In the 1860s and 70s, several inventors attempted FDM under the names of acoustic telegraphy and harmonic telegraphy. Practical FDM was only achieved in the electronic age. Meanwhile, their efforts led to an elementary understanding of electroacoustic technology, resulting in the invention of the telephone.

== See also ==
- Orthogonal frequency-division multiplexing (OFDM)
- Non-orthogonal frequency-division multiplexing (N-OFDM)
