= L System =

L system may refer to:

- L-system or Lindenmayer systems in biology
- L-carrier AT&T Transcontinental Cable System
- Taito L System arcade system board
- An alternative name for Chicago "L" mass transit system
- The main system of transport for tyrosine across biological cell membranes and the blood–brain barrier.
