= Zone Usage Measurement =

Zone Usage Measurement (ZUM) is the method by which phone companies in California distinguished "local" service from "long distance" service within the service area to which local phone companies used to be restricted.

Usually the local calling area includes a 13-mile (21 km) radius from the point of origination. The ZUM zone beyond that is divided into ZUM1 (12-13 mile radius), ZUM2 (14-15 mile (24 km) radius), and ZUM3 (15-16 mile (26 km) radius). Beyond the ZUM zone calls are considered intra-LATA or inter-LATA.

== Background ==
Local Access and Transport Areas (LATA) were created after the breakup of the Bell System. They are sometimes called service areas, or local toll calling areas. California, for example, is divided into 11 service areas. Calls made to places within the same service area break down as follows:

=== Rural ===
Local Calls: 0–12 miles
Local Toll: 13+ miles (within service area)

=== Urban ===
Local Calls: 0–12 miles
Zone Usage Measurement (ZUM), or Zone 3: 13–16 miles

=== Local Toll ===
17+ miles (within service area)

Calls within each area, up to about 12 miles, are local calls. In metropolitan areas, calls between 13 and 16 miles are Zone Usage Measurement (ZUM) Zone 3 calls. All other calls within each Service Area are now referred to as Local Toll calls. In non-ZUM areas Local Toll calls start at 13 miles.
