= Herman Affel =

American electrical engineer (1893–1972)

- Lloyd Espenschied (left) and Affel (right) c. 1950–1960
- Born: Herman Andrew Affel; August 4, 1893
- Died: October 13, 1972 (aged 79)
- Education: Massachusetts Institute of Technology
- Occupation: Electrical engineer
- Known for: Inventing the modern coaxial cable
- Spouse: Bertha May Plummer

Herman Andrew Affel (August 4, 1893 – October 13, 1972) was an American electrical engineer who invented the modern coaxial cable.

== Biography ==
He was born on August 4, 1893. He attended MIT. He later married Bertha May Plummer.

From MIT he went to work at Bell Laboratories. Among other projects he worked with Lloyd Espenschied on the characteristics of coaxial cable. Espenschied and Affel jointly applied for a patent on a wideband coaxial cable system of transmission, filed in 1929 and granted in 1934. The invention was disclosed in a prize-winning paper published in AIEE's Electrical Engineering in October 1934.

He died on October 13, 1972.

== Legacy ==
In 2006, Affel was inducted into the National Inventors Hall of Fame.

== US Patents ==
- U.S. patent 1,511,013 "Equalization of Carrier Transmissions," 1924, Herman A. Affel
- U.S. patent 1,835,031 "Concentric Conducting System", 1929, Lloyd Espenschied and Herman A. Affel

== See also ==
- L carrier
- Carrier telephony
