= Toll restriction =

Telephone service feature

Toll restriction or toll denial is a telephony feature offered by a telephone company that configures a telephone line to be configured so that it is impossible to originate long-distance calls from that line, or to accept charges reversed to the telephone number by other parties. Such lines usually allow calls to be made to no-charge numbers locally and toll-free so that customers can still initialte local and some long-distance calls.

Most commonly this restriction is applied at the request of the owner of the premises, who does not wish to be subject to unlimited liability for costly unauthorised calls made by others at the site. Restriction of calls to overseas or premium-rate telephone numbers are common options on some systems, such as voice over IP. Private branch exchange clients are often able to configure toll restriction on a per-extension basis through the local PBX, either blocking all trunk calls or requiring that a numeric password be dialled to complete the call.

Toll restriction features are categorized in a set of seven classes, Class 0 through Class 6.

Telephone companies may sometimes require high-risk-account customers, or those requiring basic phone service for security and health reasons, to accept toll restriction.
