= Long-haul communications =

In telecommunications, the term long-haul communications has the following meanings:

1. In public switched networks, pertaining to circuits that span large distances, such as the circuits in inter-LATA, interstate, and international communications. See also Long line (telecommunications)

2. In the military community, communications among users on a national or worldwide basis.

Note 1: Compared to tactical communications, long-haul communications are characterized by (a) higher levels of users, such as the US National Command Authority, (b) more stringent performance requirements, such as higher quality circuits, (c) longer distances between users, including worldwide distances, (d) higher traffic volumes and densities, (e) larger switches and trunk cross sections, and (f) fixed and recoverable assets.

Note 2: "Long-haul communications" usually pertains to the U.S. Defense Communications System.

Note 3: "Long-haul telecommunications technicians" can be translated into many fields of IT work within the corporate industry (Information Technology, Network Technician, Telecommunication Specialist, It Support, and so on). While the term is used in military most career fields that are in communications such as 3D1X2 - Cyber Transport Systems (the career field has been renamed so many times over the course of many years but essentially it is the same job (Network Infrastructure Tech., Systems Control Technician, and Cyber Transport Systems)) or may work in areas that require the "in between" (cloud networking) for networks (MSPP, ATM, Routers, Switches), phones (VOIP, DS0 - DS4 or higher, and so on), encryption (configuring encryption devices or monitoring), and video support data transfers. The "bulk data transfer" or aggregation networking.

The Long-haul telecommunication technicians is considered a "jack of all" but it is much in the technician's interest to gather greater education with certifications to qualify for certain jobs outside the military. The Military provides an avenue but does not make the individual a master of the career field. The technician will find that the job out look outside of military requires many things that aren't required of them within the career field while in the military. So it is best to find the job that is similar to the AFSC and also view the companies description of the qualification to fit that job. Also at least get an associate degree, over 5 years experience, and all of the required "certs" (Network +, Security +, CCNA, CCNP and so on) to acquire the job or at least an interview. The best time to apply or get a guaranteed job is the last three months before you leave the military. Military personnel that are within the career field 3D1X2 require a Secret, TS, or TS with SCI clearance in order to do the job.

== See also ==
- Long-distance calling
- Meteor burst communications

This article incorporates public domain material from Federal Standard 1037C. General Services Administration. Archived from the original on 2022-01-22. (in support of MIL-STD-188).
