= Long line (telecommunications) =

Transmission line in a long-distance communications network

In telecommunications, a long line is a transmission line in a long-distance communications network such as carrier systems, microwave radio relay links, geosynchronous satellite links, underground cables, aerial cables and open wire, and submarine communications cables.

== Microwave networks ==
In the United States, the term gained visibility through the establishment of AT&T Long Lines division of the Bell System in 1947 when a radio relay between New York and Boston that was made up of seven radio relay stations was inaugurated. The division was subsequently spun out as AT&T Long Distance with the breakup of AT&T in 1984.

Though supplanted by fiber-optic networks for long-distance communications, private microwave networks between key stock markets within United States and within Europe gained popularity among high-frequency traders after 2010 as it has significantly lower levels of latency compared with fiber networks.

== See also ==
- Long-haul communications
- Long-distance calling
