= Lloyd Espenschied =

American engineer and inventor

- Espenschied (at left) with Herman Andrew Affel, c. 1950–1960
- Born: April 27, 1889; St. Louis, Missouri, US
- Died: June 21, 1986 (aged 97); Flushing, New York, US
- Awards: IEEE Medal of Honor (1940)
- Scientific career
- Fields: Electrical engineering

Lloyd Espenschied (April 27, 1889 – June 21, 1986) was an American electrical engineer who invented the modern coaxial cable with Herman Andrew Affel.

== Early life and education ==
Lloyd Espenschied was born in Baden, North St. Louis, Missouri, on April 27, 1889, the son of Frederick F. Espenschied (January 3, 1856 – July 22, 1908) and Clara M. Espenschied (January 14, 1856 – March 26, 1947). Fred was an 1875 graduate of the St. Louis Law School, which is today part of Washington University. He served as private secretary to his brother-in-law, Mayor Henry von Overstolz. Under Mayor David R. Francis, Fred later became City Treasurer before becoming State Senator from 1891 to 1893. Lloyd had two siblings: a brother Frederic, and a sister Clare.

Espenschied moved to Brooklyn, New York during his childhood. By 1904, he was already exploring wireless telegraphy and became an amateur radio operator. He entered the Pratt Institute in 1907, and obtained a certificate of applied engineering. During summers, he worked for the United Wireless Telegraph Company.

== Career ==
Espenschied worked as an engineer for Telefunken Wireless Telegraph Company during 1909–1910. He later worked for the American Telephone and Telegraph Company and later Bell Telephone Laboratories in various capacities from 1910 to 1937. In the 17 years preceding his retirement in 1954, Espenschied was staff research consultant and consulting engineer at Bell Telephone Laboratories.

Beginning in 1916, Espenschied worked with Herman Affel and other colleagues on a carrier system from Baltimore to Pittsburgh. This work led to Espenschied and Affel creating the first modern coaxial cable. Their invention paved the way for television transmission. The cable advanced long distance telephone service, making it possible to carry thousands of simultaneous phone calls on long distance circuits. In 1930, he applied for a patent on a device based on a mathematical analysis used by the radio altimeter invented by William Littell Everitt at Ohio State University. Espenschied was the holder of more than 100 patents in both wire and radio communication systems.

== Personal life and death ==
In April 1912, Espenschied married another Pratt student, Ethel Fairfield Lovejoy, known as "Lovey". They were married for over 60 years, and had two children.

An avid genealogist, Espenschied visited Germany for the purpose of extensive research. While abroad, he was able to ascertain the German background of his family. Returning to St. Louis in 1937–38 to trace his American family pattern, he discovered that the original Louis Espenschied wagon plant created by his grandfather was gone and that the Luedinghaus-Espenschied Wagon Company had been deserted.

Espenschied was an isolationist and opposed American involvement in World War II. When interviewed during the war by a member of the United States Department of War, he stated: "We were led into this mess largely by British propaganda, Jewish propaganda, Roosevelt imperialism."

Espenschied died on June 21, 1986, at a nursing home in Holmdel, New Jersey, at the age of 97.
