= Lenkurt Electric Company =

Lenkurt Electric Company was an American microwave and telecommunications company. It was established in California and grew to a sizable company by 1955. It was later acquired by General Telephone and Electronics Company.

== History ==
The roots of Lenkurt Electric Company can be traced as early as 1935 when its predecessor started the development and manufacture of electronic equipment. The company adopted its name in 1933 and was taken from its founders Lennart Erickson and Kurt Appert. By this time, it focused on the development and manufacture of carrier current communications equipment. In the first year they were based in San Francisco with 10 employees, but this grew to around 75 by 1947 when they moved to San Carlos, California. The company published a monthly monograph for customers titled Lenkurt Demodulator that served as both educational and promotional material.

In 1959 the company merged with General Telephone and Electronics Company.

Kurt Appert collaborated with Arthur Norberg in an oral history project. He published Electrical Engineering and the Lenkurt Electric Company: Oral History Transcript in 1974. Appert provided his own biographical information.

- Kurt E. Appert: Electrical Engineering and the Lenkurt Electric Company
- Electrical Engineering and the Lenkurt Electric Company: Oral History Transcript 1974

== Unbuilt factory ==
In 1955 they engaged Frank Lloyd Wright, assisted by Aaron Green to build them new premises in San Carlos. However, the building was never built as Lenkurt were bought out by GTE.
