= Channel bank =

Device that performs multiplexing or demultiplexing of communications channels

A T1 feed demultiplexed through a Newbridge channel bank to 24 channels with an Amphenol connector

In telecommunications, a channel bank is a device that performs multiplexing or demultiplexing of a group of communications channels, such as analog or digital telephone lines, into one channel of higher bandwidth or higher digital bit rate, such as a DS-1 (T1) circuit, so that all the channels can be sent simultaneously over a single cable called a trunk line.

A channel bank may be located in a telephone exchange, or in an enterprise's telephone closet or enclosure where it breaks out individual telephone lines from a high-capacity telephone trunk line connected to the central telephone office, or the enterprise's PBX system.

== See also ==
- Multiplexer
- Multiplexing
- Digital Signal 1
- Carrier system
