= Long-distance calling =

Telephone call charged at a higher rate

In telecommunications, a long-distance call (U.S.) or trunk call (also known as a toll call in the UK) is a telephone call made to a location outside a defined local calling area. Long-distance calls are typically charged a higher billing rate than local calls. The term is not necessarily synonymous with placing calls to another telephone area code.

Long-distance calls are classified into two categories: national or domestic calls which connect two points within the same country, and international calls which connect two points in different countries. Within the United States there is a further division into long-distance calls within a single state (intrastate) and interstate calls, which are subject to different regulations (counter-intuitively, calls within states are usually more expensive than interstate calls). Not all interstate calls are long-distance calls. Since 1984 there has also been a distinction between intra-local access and transport area (LATA) calls and those between different LATAs, whose boundaries are not necessarily state boundaries.

Before direct distance dialing (DDD), all long-distance calls were established by special switchboard operators (long-distance operators) even in exchanges where calls within the local exchange were dialed directly. Completion of long-distance calls was time-consuming and costly as each call was handled by multiple operators in multiple cities. Record keeping was also more complex, as the duration of every toll call had to be manually recorded for billing purposes.

In many less-developed countries, such as Spain, Mexico, Brazil, and Egypt, calls were placed at a central office the caller went to, filled out a paper slip, sometimes paid in advance for the call, and then waited for it to be connected. In Spain these were known as locutorios, literally "a place to talk". In towns too small to support a phone office, placing long-distance calls was a sideline for some businesses with telephones, such as pharmacies.

In some countries, such as Canada and the United States, long-distance rates were historically kept artificially high to subsidize unprofitable flat-rate local residential services. Intense competition between long-distance telephone companies narrowed these gaps significantly in most developed nations in the late 20th century.

The cost of international calls varies dramatically among countries. The receiving country has total discretion in specifying what the caller should be charged (by the originating company, who in a separate transaction transfers these funds to the destination country) for the cost of connecting the incoming international call with the destination customer anywhere in the receiving country. This has only a loose, and in some cases no, relation to the actual cost. Some less-developed countries, or their telephone company(s), use these fees as a revenue source.

== History ==
On August 10, 1876, Alexander Graham Bell made a call via the telegraph line between Brantford and Paris, Ontario, eight miles (thirteen kilometres) distant. This test was said by many sources to be the "world's first long-distance call". This test certainly proved that the telephone could work over long distances, at least as a one-way call.

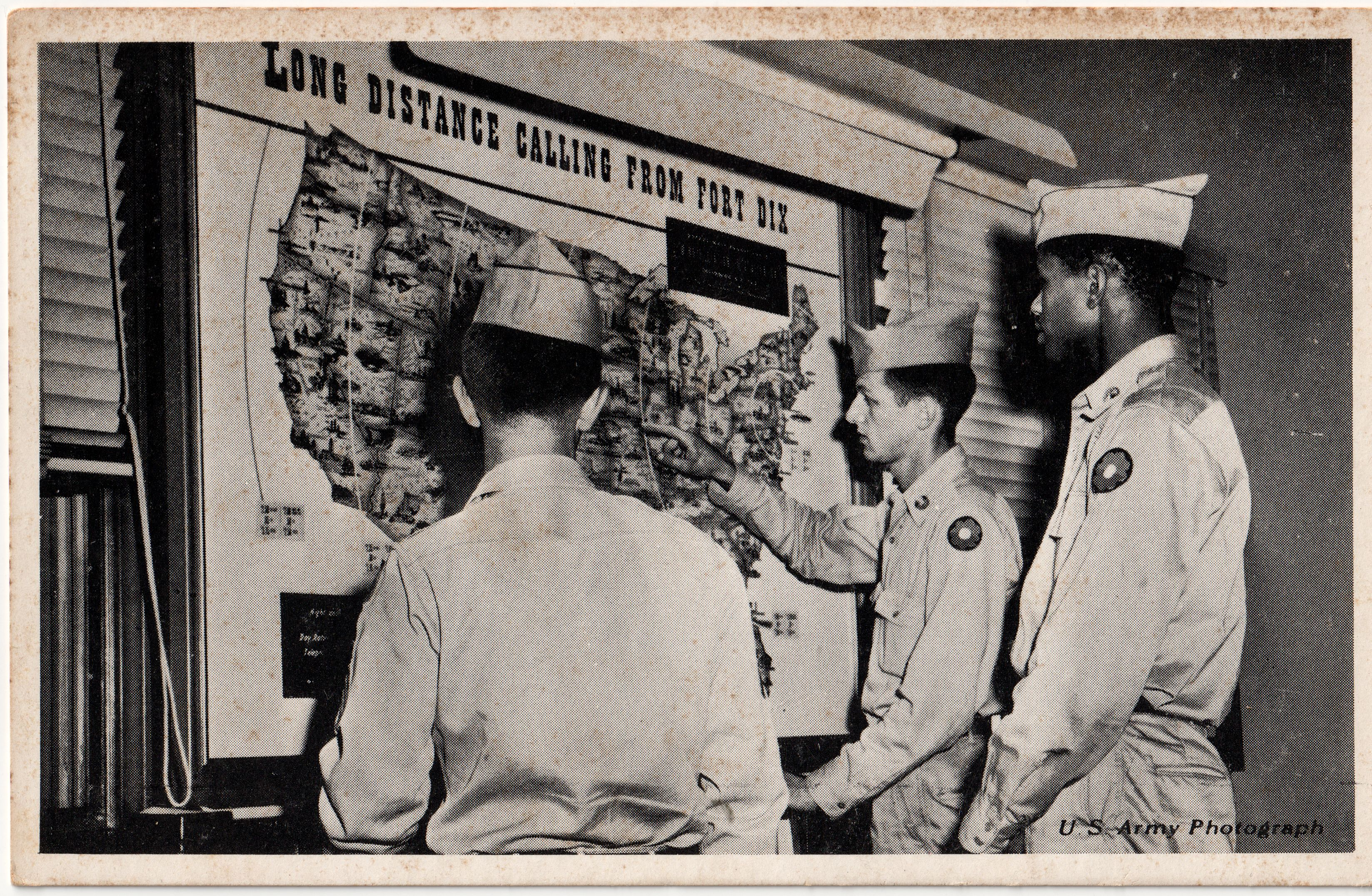
US Army soldiers studying the map to make a long-distance call at Fort Dix, 1940s or 1950s

Following a major flood in 1877, the president of the Chesapeake and Ohio Canal, Arthur Pue Gorman, hired J. Frank Morrison to build a communications line. The initial plan was for a telegraph, but due to rapid advances in technology, the project was changed to a telephone system which promised lower operating costs. Morrison's construction gangs worked through the summer of 1879, completing a line that stretched over 180 miles from Georgetown to Cumberland, Maryland. The system used forty-eight Edison Universal Telephones stationed at intervals along the route, and was considered a pioneering achievement, the world's first commercial long distance telephone service.

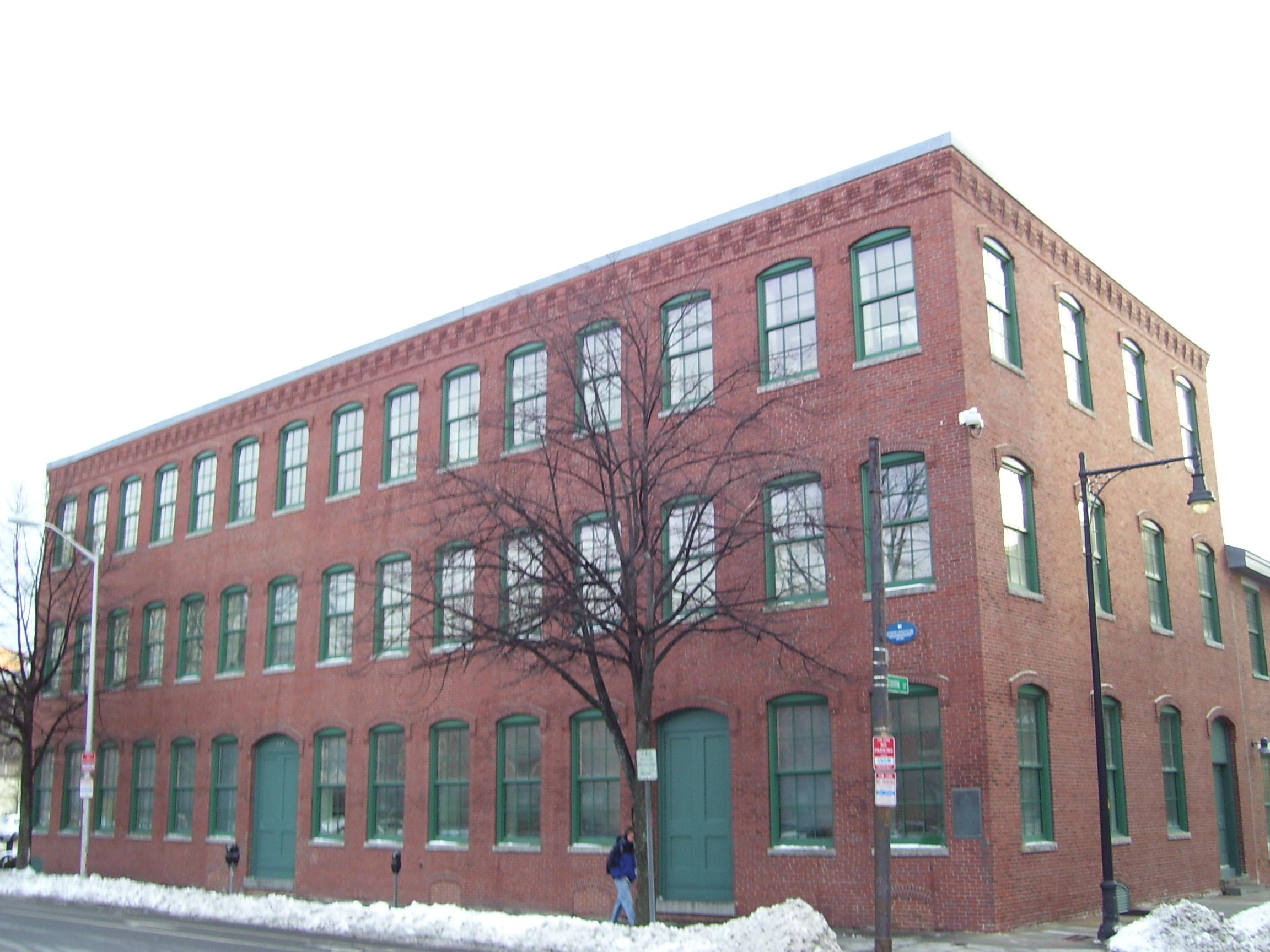
Site of one end of the first U.S. intercity telephone call in 1876 in Cambridge, Massachusetts. Another early call between cities had been made in Canada by telephone inventor Alexander Graham Bell.

In 1891, AT&T built an interconnect telephone network, which reached from New York to Chicago, the technological limit for non-amplified wiring. Users often did not use their own phone for such connections, but made an appointment to use a special long-distance telephone booth or "silence cabinet" equipped with 4-wire telephones and other advanced technology. The invention of loading coils extended the range to Denver in 1911, again reaching a technological limit. A major research venture and contest led to the development of the audion—originally invented by Lee De Forest and greatly improved by others in the years between 1907 and 1914—which provided the means for telephone signals to reach from coast to coast. Such transcontinental calling was made possible in 1914 but was not showcased until early 1915, as a promotion for the upcoming Panama–Pacific International Exposition in San Francisco in the spring of the same year.

On January 25, 1915, Alexander Graham Bell ceremonially initiated the first transcontinental telephone call from 15 Dey Street in New York City, which was received by his former assistant Thomas A. Watson at 333 Grant Avenue in San Francisco. This process, nevertheless, involved five intermediary telephone operators and took 23 minutes to connect by manually patching in the route of the call.

"On Oct. 9, 1876, Alexander Graham Bell and Thomas A. Watson talked by telephone to each other over a two-mile wire stretched between Cambridge and Boston. It was the first wire conversation ever held. Yesterday afternoon the same two men talked by telephone to each other over a 3,400-mile wire between New York and San Francisco. Dr. Bell, the veteran inventor of the telephone, was in New York, and Mr. Watson, his former associate, was on the other side of the continent. They heard each other much more distinctly than they did in their first talk thirty-eight years ago."

— New York Times, Jan 26, 1915.

On November 10, 1951, the first direct dial long-distance telephone call in North America was placed from Mayor M. Leslie Denning of Englewood, New Jersey to Mayor Frank Osborne of Alameda, California via AT&T's Bell System. The ten-digit call (seven digits plus a three-digit area code) was connected automatically within 18 seconds.

The first subscriber trunk dialing in the United Kingdom was deployed December 5, 1958 with Elizabeth II placing a call from Bristol to Edinburgh.

=== International calling ===
After World War II, priority was given by AT&T in the US and the various PTT entities in Europe to automating switching on the toll networks in their respective countries (initially for Operator Toll Dialing). Thus, when TAT-1 was opened for service, it was connected to international gateway offices at White Plains, NY, and London that were already automated for domestic calls. These were designed to be able to automatically switch outward and inward international circuits as soon as common signalling standards (and political considerations) could be negotiated. However, at the outset, to set up an international call, multiple operators were required: one to originate the call and one at each national gateway to complete a call via either ringdown to a local operator or Operator Toll Dialing.

International direct dialling from London to Paris was first offered in March 1963, with Amsterdam following by the end of 1963. Simultaneously, operator-dialed transatlantic calling began March 30, 1963 with the originating international operator in Western Europe or the US able to complete calls to the terminal station without further operator assistance via the gateway exchanges at White Plains and London. Operator-dialed transpacific calling to Hawaii, Japan, and Australia began with the completion of the Commonwealth Pacific Cable System (COMPAC)cable, also in 1963.

By mid-1968, transatlantic cable capacity had increased to the point where scheduling calls between Western Europe, the UK, and the US was no longer necessary and calls were completed on demand. Transatlantic international direct dialing between New York City (212 area code) and London (01 STD code) was introduced in 1970, with service extended to the whole of the US and the six largest UK cities in 1971.

=== Collect/reverse-charge calling ===
Various schemes were devised to allow large organisations to automatically accept collect calls, where the recipient pays long-distance charges for any call from a predefined area. A Zenith number in the late 1950s required an operator manually determine the destination number from a printed list; the 1967 Wide Area Telephone Service introduced the first automated toll-free telephone numbers, terminated on special fixed-rate trunks. By the 1980s, computerisation of the system allowed British Telecom "Linkline" 0800 freephone numbers and AT&T +1-800- toll-free numbers to be controlled by a database and terminated virtually anywhere with each inbound call itemised and billed individually. This smart network was further refined to provide toll-free number portability in the 1990s.

=== Technical advances ===
Improvements in switching technology, the deployment of high-capacity optical fibre and an increase in competition substantially lowered long-distance rates at the end of the 20th century. Using the Internet, the distinction between local and long-distance communication is fading to the point where an Internet call from the United States to Beijing carries a lower wholesale cost than a domestic landline call to a rural independent in small-town Iowa.

"Calling Packages" and "Internet Phoning" (VOIP) were cited as a contributing factor towards "Swiftly Ending a High-Cost Category" in 2004.

== Example of manual operator call ==
Dramatization of an operator-assisted long distance call c. 1949

In the radio series Dragnet, Sgt. Joe Friday (Jack Webb) places an operator assisted person-to-person long-distance call to a number reached via a manual switchboard in Fountain Green, Utah, a town of several hundred people served by an independent telephone company. In the call, Friday calls a long-distance operator in Los Angeles and gives the name and number of the called party. The operator then calls a rate-and-route operator, who responds that the call should be routed through Salt Lake City and Mount Pleasant, Utah, and that the rate-step for the call is 140. The long-distance operator would mark her ticket with that rate-step, and could use it to quote the rate from her rate table, in terms of the first three minutes and each additional minute, if the caller requested the toll.

The Los Angeles long-distance operator then plugs into a direct trunk to the Salt Lake City inward operator and asks her for Mount Pleasant; the Salt Lake operator rings Mount Pleasant, where the Los Angeles operator asks for Fountain Green. The Mount Pleasant operator rings Fountain Green, and the Los Angeles operator gives the Fountain Green operator the number and name of the called party in Fountain Green. The Fountain Green operator rings the number, 14R2, a party line where a specific ringing pattern summons the second subscriber on the shared line. A man answers; the Los Angeles operator asks for the called party and states that Los Angeles is calling.

This dramatization illustrates the cumbersome, costly, and time-consuming process needed for long-distance calling before direct distance dialing was available. Local calls within the Los Angeles area had long been dialed directly, but a long-distance call to a distant state was a complex manual effort. The caller would dial the long-distance operator (typically ‘110’ or ‘211’ in large Bell System cities of that era; ’0’ was for local assistance) and provide the destination city name and called number as well as their own number for billing purposes as there was no automatic number identification. Before the era of Operator Toll Dialing, which began in the 1940s, an operator would first set up the route, then ring back the original caller minutes later to announce the call was ready, rather than having the caller remain on the line.

Once operator toll dialing was implemented, the operator would have received a numerical routing from the rate & route operator, such as "Mark: Other Place. Route: A ring-down. Numbers: 801 plus 073 plus 181. Operators 801 plus 073 plus." This routing would allow the Los Angeles operator to dial via the tandem switch (i.e., class-4 telephone switch) to the Mount Pleasant operator's switchboard, and have the call come in on a special trunk (designated by the 181 code) used for incoming calls to ring-down points (places with manual service whose connection to the national network was via a larger point).

Routing was important even when many medium-sized and smaller cities had automatic local service, but were not yet reachable by the growing numbers of people in cities with direct dialing. For example, if by the late 1950s, Fountain Green had upgraded its manual service with an automatic (dial-enabled four-digit number) system, an operator could often dial the call after obtaining the rate and route. The operator could add the three-digit office prefix to the local four-digit number, which in a few years would become the seven-digit number of the recipient.

== Regional variations ==
The definition of "local" or "long distance" calling (and the corresponding pricing) is largely a regulatory construct, by which every point outside an arbitrary group of exchange boundaries is charged at a higher "trunk call" or "toll call" rate. The charges often do not correlate directly to either straight-line distance or network topology; two exchanges 75 km apart may be local in some cases, while in other cases an adjacent pair of exchanges (or even two different exchange prefixes on the same physical switch) may arbitrarily be long-distance.

=== Canada ===
In Canada, local calls from landline telephones are flat-rated even in the largest cities (unlike the United States, which has metered service in a few of the largest markets). Local telephone numbers were lengthened to a standard seven digits in all of the largest markets in 1958 to accommodate US-style direct-dial equipment (Montréal and Toronto previously had 2L+4N six-digit local calling; smaller communities had four or five digits).

Long-distance calling from landlines was opened to competition in the early 1990s and the use of long-distance revenue to subsidise local service was phased out a few years later. It is not possible for mobile telephone subscribers or coin-paid telephone users to select a default carrier, so long-distance calls are often priced higher from these services. The use of prepaid telephone calling cards is a possible workaround.

=== United Kingdom ===
The regulatory structure in British Telecom exchanges differs from the North American system as there are no free local calls. A long-distance call is therefore known not as a "toll call" but as a trunk call. It traditionally carried a higher rate ("national rate" instead of "local rate") and requires a trunk prefix and area code be dialled before the number. A trunk call is prefixed with '0' for national calls and '00' (used to be '010') for international calls, following the European standard. It is now normal for local calls to cost the same as long-distance UK calls, and is now common, for a small extra monthly charge, to allow free calls to landlines within the UK. This free call allowance does not normally cover calls to the Isle of Man or the Channel Islands, which whilst having UK national dialling codes, are separate telephone administrations.

International calling from the UK is deregulated in that many alternative providers allow low-cost international calling by the caller dialling an access code, usually beginning with the digit 1, followed by the full international code. These services generally use Internet-based connections in the same way as computer-based services such as Skype, Friend Caller and many others, but with the added convenience of there being no need to use a computer. It is this use of the Internet for the calls which allows such low prices. Often these same services are available from a mobile phone by the use of a special access number, though in this case there may be a charge equivalent to that of a standard landline call.

=== United States ===
The US regulatory structure splits long-distance calls into two major categories. An intrastate call is regulated under state law. Federal regulation applies to interstate calls (being interstate commerce).

In 1968, the Federal Communications Commission forced AT&T to allow MCI to connect their own long-distance lines into the Bell system.

During the 1984 breakup of the Bell System, the local access and transport area or LATA concept was created to distinguish between in-region calls (which were handled by local telephone companies such as the Baby Bells) and out-of-region calls (handled by interexchange carriers such as AT&T, MCI and Sprint).

The breakup of the Bell system in 1984 came with federally imposed rules to allow the Baby Bells and other long-distance providers to compete via "equal access." Equal access allows telephone subscribers to choose an authorized telephone company or companies to handle their local toll and long-distance toll (including international) calls from traditional “POTS” (Plain Old Telephone Service) wired telephone lines.

Various feature groups were used where equal access is available to allow callers to select a long-distance carrier for each call. In feature group 'D', the current system, subscribers may dial the prefix "10" and a three-digit code identifying a long-distance carrier to handle the InterLATA call. For example, 10-288 sent a call via AT&T, 10-333 via Sprint, and 10-550 via CenturyLink. Starting in July 1998, "10" needed to be used before the five-digit carrier selection. For example, 10-10-288 for AT&T.

Area code 700, rarely used, is reserved for carrier-specific services; each carrier places a recorded self-identification message on 1-700-555-4141 to allow a subscriber to identify the default InterLATA carrier for their line.

Long-distance calls may be classified into two groups. Interstate long-distance or inter-LATA interstate long-distance, the most common group, is the one for which long-distance carriers are usually chosen by telephone customers. Another form of long-distance call, increasingly relevant to more U.S. states, is known as an inter-LATA intrastate long-distance call. This refers to a calling area outside of the customer's LATA but within the customer's state. While technically and legally long-distance, this calling area is not necessarily served by the same carrier used for "regular" long-distance, or may be provided at different rates. In some cases, customer confusion occurs as, due to rate or carrier distinctions, a local long-distance call can be billed at a higher per-minute rate than interstate long-distance calls, despite being a shorter distance.

Often, in large LATAs, there is also a class known by the oxymoronic name local long-distance, which refers to calls within the customer's LATA but outside their local calling area. This area is normally served by the customer's local telephone provider, which is usually one of the Baby Bells, despite attempts by some CLECs to compete in the local telephone market.

In California, in addition to intra-LATA and inter-LATA calling, there are ZUM (Zone Usage Measurement) areas within the local Service Areas.

Callers are usually offered a variety of rate "plans" depending on usage, although which plan is cheapest for a given amount of usage is often not obvious. Plans may be "unlimited" or may package an initial number of minutes and charge additional minutes at a flat rate, and further varieties abound. Some plans can be compared easily if the number of minutes of usage will be estimated in advance, but others are not as clearly comparable. Some of these plans can be found on websites that compare a variety of long-distance phone and phone card options, giving consumers useful and timely information.

Long-distance calls were once "special" and costly. Costs declined and by 2004, "unlimited telephone packages" were available. "Millions" of people were no longer subject to specific long-distance pricing by that time.

The long distance business peaked in 2000. By 2008, revenues were halved. One analyst attributed the decline to the Telecommunications Act of 1996, which increased competition between Baby Bells and AT&T.

== See also ==
- Long Lines
- Long-haul communications
- Toll restriction
- Trunk vs Toll
- Voice over Internet Protocol is often used to reduce the costs of long-distance services
- Interexchange carrier
  - Carrier access code
