= L carrier =

Analog long-distance telephone multiplexing system

The L carrier system was one of a series of carrier systems developed by AT&T for high-capacity transmission for long-distance communications. It was the first designed to handle hundreds of voice frequency telephone lines, compared to earlier carrier systems which handled 12 or fewer channels. Over a period from the late 1930s to the 1970s, the system evolved in six significant phases of development, designated by Bell System engineers as L-1 through L-5, and L-5E. Coaxial cable was the principal transmission medium in all stages, initially lending the system another description i.e. the coaxial system. It was the successor to a series of previous carrier systems, typically identified by capital letters. In the 1960s, the system was hardened against the dangers of the Cold War using complete placement of all terminal and repeater equipment in hardened underground vaults.

== Development ==
System	Year	Frequency	Working coaxial pairs per sheath	Repeater distance	Voice channels per tube
L-1	1941	3 MHz	3	8 miles (13 km)	600
L-3	1953	8 MHz	5	4 miles (6.4 km)	1,860
L-4	1967	17 MHz	9	2 miles (3.2 km)	3,600
L-5	1974	57 MHz	10	1 mile (1.6 km)	10,800
L-5E	1975	66 MHz	10	1 mile	13,200

Initial development and testing of the coaxial system took place between 1935 and 1937 on a test bed of a 95-mile (153 km) two-way coaxial cable between locations in New York City and Philadelphia. A distance of 3,800 miles (6,100 km) was simulated by repeatedly remodulating signals and looping them twenty times between the endpoints. The system provided 240 channels over a single circuit.

The first production installation of the L-1 carrier system went into service between Stevens Point, Wisconsin and Minneapolis, Minnesota in 1941 over a distance of almost 200 miles (320 km). with a capacity of 480 channels, far more than could be carried by balanced pair carrier telephony systems, and cheaper per channel for high-usage routes.

A small-scale L-type carrier system between Baltimore, Maryland and Washington, D.C. was intended for short-distance low-volume traffic. The system likely to be designated L-2 was abandoned at an early stage in the 1940s.

With the anticipation of the end of war-time responsibilities, AT&T announced in December 1944 a development plan for nationwide build-out of the coaxial carrier network for support of not only long-distance telephone service, but also for television transmissions. The result of post-war research of this goal was the definition of the L-3 carrier system.

Each successive version had at least twice as many channels as the previous version, culminating in the L-5E design in 1976. AT&T Long Lines built two coast-to-coast systems of L-3 as well as shorter ones connecting major cities, especially the big cities of the eastern United States, as a supplement to the mainstay microwave transmission systems. Some were later upgraded to L-4, while others were simply overbuilt with a new L-5 system.

== Principles ==
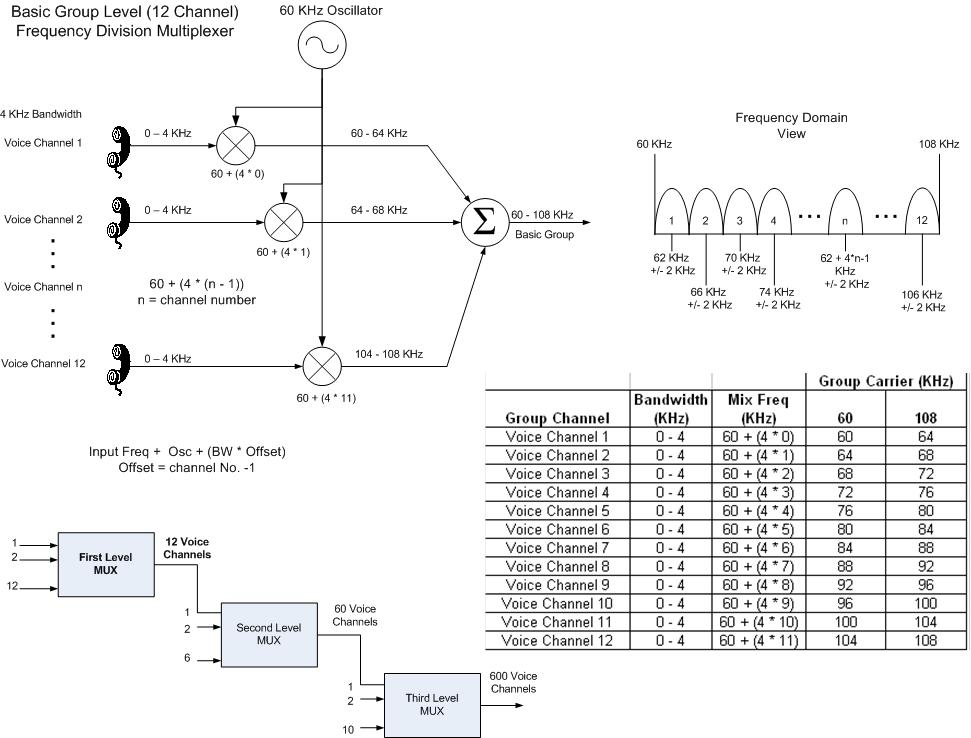
Level 1 diagram

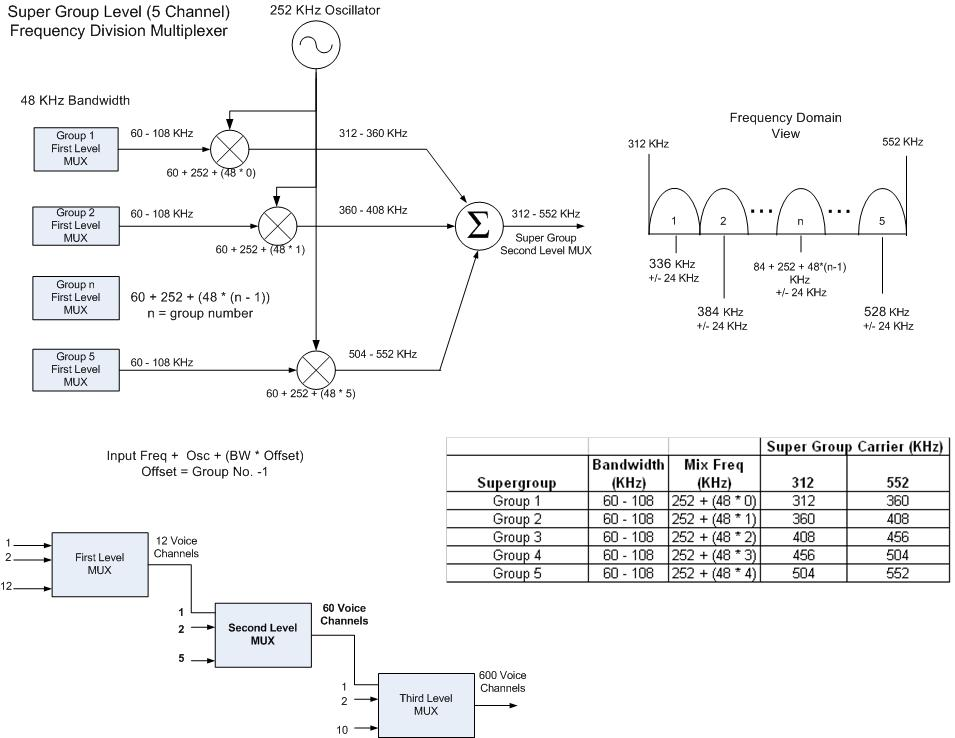
Level 2 diagram

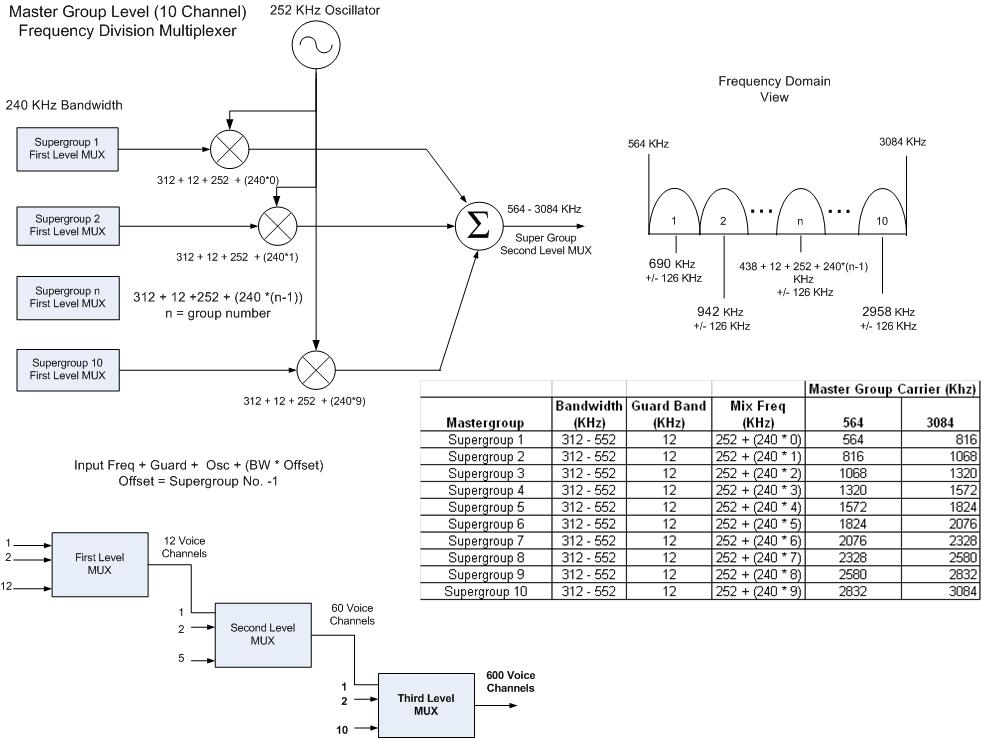
Level 3 diagram

Starting in 1911, telephone networks used frequency-division multiplexing to carry several voice channels on a single physical circuit, beginning with the first Type C carrier in that year, which heterodyned three voice channels stacked on top of one voice circuit. L carrier systems were loaded by multiplexing and supermultiplexing single sideband channels, using the long-standard 12-channel "voice group" produced by Type A channel banks, occupying a frequency spectrum between 60 and 108 kHz. This basic group was the entire line spectrum on previous long-haul carrier systems, such as Types J and K. The first Type A-1 channel banks appeared for use on Type J open-wire carrier in 1934. It was the work of Espenschied and Herman Affel of Bell Labs who patented piezoelectric crystal lattice filters to provide sharp bandpass cutoff that made all single-sideband carriers work. Such lattice filters were the heart of all analog multiplex systems using single-sideband/carrier-suppressed architecture until active IC-based filtering became available in the mid-1970s.

In single-sideband modulation schemes, twelve voice channels would be modulated into a channel group. In turn, five groups could themselves be multiplexed by a similar method into a supergroup, containing 60 voice channels. One 48 kHz group-band circuit was sometimes used for a single high-speed data link rather than for voice circuits. Also, entire supergroups could be dedicated as a single data channel running a data rate of 56 kbit/s as early as the late 1960s.

In long-distance systems, supergroups were multiplexed into mastergroups of 300 voice channels (European CCITT hierarchy) or 600 (AT&T Long Lines Type L-600 Multiplex) for transmission by coaxial cable or microwave.

There were even higher levels of multiplexing, and it became possible to send thousands of voice channels over a single circuit. For example, Type L-4 system used the "Multi-Master Group" system to stack six U600 mastergroups into the L4 line spectrum, while the same hardware was modified to take three of these MMG spectra and stack them into an early L5 line spectrum. Later advancements in technology allowed for even more stacking on the Type L-5E, allowing 22 mastergroups to be stacked into a 66 MHz line spectrum. The accompanying diagrams are of the process of a Bell System A type channel bank forming a mastergroup in three stages.

== Applications ==
L carrier also carried the first television network connections, though the later microwave transmission system soon became more important for this purpose. Type L-3 was used for a short time for coast-to-coast network television feeds, but the advent of NTSC color was the cause for the move to Type TD microwave transmission. The tube repeaters of the L-3 added too much group delay to the baseband broadcast signal for the cables to be of much use to broadcasters, and "L-pipes" weren't used for broadcast television much after around 1964.

A variant of the 1950s L-3 system was designed in the early 1960s to provide for land line connections between key military command and control facilities in the United States. Starting with L-3I (improved) the system was upgraded to be able to withstand nuclear attack. The system consisted of over 100 main stations and 1000 individual repeater vaults. The main stations had emergency power systems, blast doors, and accommodations for staff for a two-week post-attack period. Nuclear early warning systems, blast detection, and other emergency services were generally provided by redundant underground and microwave circuits in case one failed.

== Obsolescence ==
In the late 1970s and early 1980s, the L carrier system was determined to be redundant with the advance of satellite and fiber-optic communication. A few cables were upgraded to T-4 and T-5 instead of L-5, but most were never upgraded past L-4 due to advancement of technology. Generally, the advancement of glass fiber and laser technology made copper coaxial cable obsolete for all long haul carrier service, as Western Electric had fielded the FT Series G single-mode fiber cable system by 1984.
