= Carrier system =

Type of telecommunications system

A carrier system is a transmission system that transmits information, such as the voice signals of a telephone call and the video signals of television, by modulation of one or multiple carrier signals above the principal voice frequency or data rate.

Carrier systems typically transmit multiple channels of communication simultaneously over the shared medium using various forms of multiplexing. Prominent multiplexing methods of the carrier signal are time-division multiplexing (TDM) and frequency-division multiplexing (FDM). A cable television system is an example of frequency-division multiplexing. Many television programs are carried simultaneously on the same coaxial cable by sending each at a different frequency. Multiple layers of multiplexing may ultimately be performed upon a given input signal. For example, in the public switched telephone network, many telephone calls are sent over shared trunk lines by time-division multiplexing. For long-distance calls several of these channels may be sent over a communications satellite link by frequency-division multiplexing. At a given receiving node, specific channels may be demultiplexed individually.

== History ==
Carrier systems increased the economic efficiency of long-distance telephony by allowing multiple calls to share the same transmission medium. In 19th-century systems using direct baseband transmission, each wire pair carried a single telephone circuit, so routes with heavy traffic required large numbers of pairs.

The introduction of frequency-division multiplexing in the early 20th century allowed multiple voice channels to be carried on a single line (carrier telephony). Early systems were followed in the 1930s by standardized multi-channel implementations and trials such as the Morristown cable carrier experiment, which demonstrated the feasibility of transmitting multiple carrier channels over cable. Subsequent systems, including the 12-channel J and K group architectures and later coaxial carrier systems such as the L-carrier series, scaled this approach to hundreds and eventually thousands of simultaneous calls on a single transmission path.

In the 1950s, research began into further increasing the throughput of terminal equipment by using digital signals with time-division multiplexing (TDM). This work led to T-carrier, E-carrier and other similar digital systems.

Due to the shorter repeater spacings required by digital systems, long-distance transmission still used FDM until the late 1970s when optical fiber was improved to the point that digital connections became the cheapest ones for all distances, short and long. By the end of the century, analog connections between and within telephone exchanges became rare.

== See also ==
- Channel access method
