= Electrolytic detector =

Early radio receiver component

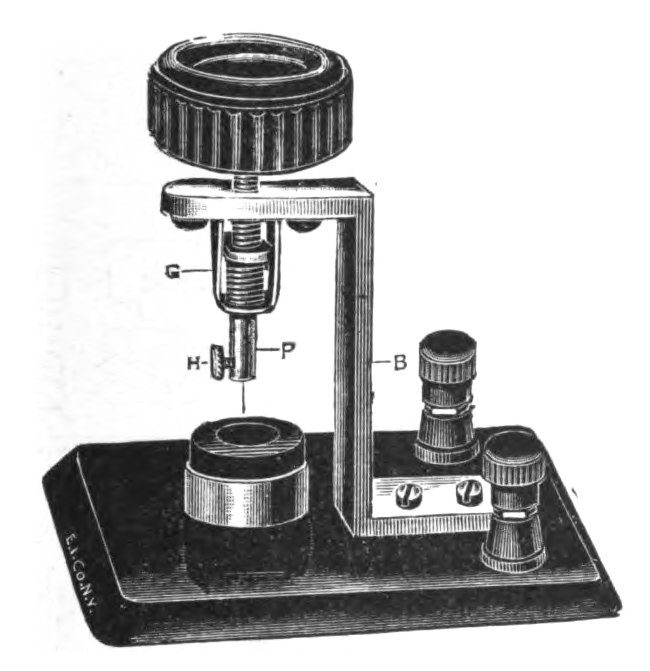
Electrolytic detector, consisting of a metal cup with nitric acid and a fine platinum wire with the tip dipping in the acid.

An electrolytic detector, or liquid barretter, is a type of detector (demodulator) used in early radio receivers. It was first used by Canadian radio researcher Reginald Fessenden in 1903, and used until about 1913, after which it was superseded by crystal detectors and vacuum tube detectors such as the Fleming valve and Audion (triode). It was considered very sensitive and reliable compared to other detectors available at the time such as the magnetic detector and the coherer. It was one of the first rectifying detectors, able to receive AM (sound) transmissions. On December 24, 1906, US Naval ships with radio receivers equipped with Fessenden's electrolytic detectors received the first AM radio broadcast from Fessenden's Brant Rock, Massachusetts transmitter, consisting of a program of Christmas music.

== History ==
Fessenden, more than any other person, is responsible for developing amplitude modulation (AM) radio transmission around 1900. While working to develop AM transmitters, he realized that the radio wave detectors used in existing radio receivers were not suitable to receive AM signals. The radio transmitters of the time transmitted information by radiotelegraphy; the transmitter was turned on and off by the operator using a switch called a telegraph key producing pulses of radio waves, to transmit text data using Morse code. Thus, receivers didn't have to extract an audio signal from the radio signal, but only detected the presence or absence of the radio frequency to produce "clicks" in the earphone representing the pulses of Morse code. The device that did this was called a "detector". The detector used in receivers of that day, called a coherer, simply acted as a switch, that conducted current in the presence of radio waves, and thus did not have the capability to demodulate, or extract the audio signal from, an amplitude-modulated radio wave.

The simplest way to extract the sound waveform from an AM signal is to rectify it; remove the oscillations on one side of the wave, converting it from an alternating current to a varying direct current. The variations in the amplitude of the radio wave that represent the sound waveform will cause variations in the current, and thus can be converted to sound by an earphone. To do this a rectifier is required, an electrical component that conducts electric current in only one direction and blocks current in the opposite direction. It was known at the time that passing current through solutions of electrolytes such as acids could have this unilateral conduction property.

In 1902 Fessenden developed what he called a "barretter" detector that would rectify an AM signal, but it was not very sensitive. The barretter used a fine platinum wire, called Wollaston wire, manufactured as a platinum core in a silver sheath that had to be stripped off with acid. In the process of stripping some Wollaston wire, Fessenden left it immersed in acid too long, eating away most of the wire until only a tip remained in contact with the solution; he noted that it responded well to radio signals being generated nearby, and could be used as new type of detector.

This story was disputed at the time, with credit for the discovery also given to Michael I. Pupin, W. Schloemilch, Hugo Gernsback and others. However, it is apparent that Fessenden was the first to put the device to practical use.

== Description ==
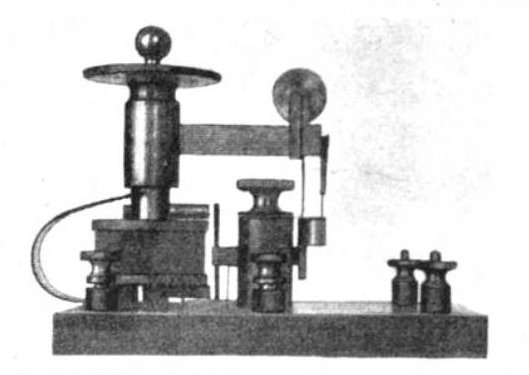
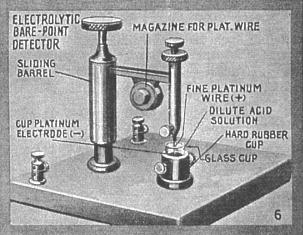
Picture of Fessenden's barretter and diagram showing parts. It included a reel of wire so that as the tip dissolved in the acid more wire could be lowered into the cup.

The action of this detector is based upon the fact that only the tip of a platinum wire a few hundred-thousandths of an inch in diameter is immersed in an electrolyte solution, and a small D.C. voltage bias is applied to the cell thus formed. Platinum is used because other metals are too quickly dissolved in the acid. The applied bias current decomposes the solution by electrolysis into tiny gas bubbles that cling to the metal point insulating the metal tip from the solution thus reducing the bias current. An incoming R.F. current can flow better in the direction across the point that makes the point more negative. That recombines the gases and increases point exposure to the liquid. RF current flow in the direction that makes the point more positive only reinforces the resistance from the gaseous blocking of the point. Detection results from this asymmetrical flow.

In practical use, a series circuit is made of the detector, headphones, and a battery with a potentiometer. The wire is made positive, and the signal to be demodulated is applied directly to it; a small (about 5 ml) platinum cup filled with either sulfuric or nitric acid completes the headphone circuit, and is also connected to ground to complete the signal circuit. To adjust the cell, the point of the wire electrode is dipped into the electrolyte and the potentiometer adjusted until a hissing noise is heard in the headphones. The potentiometer setting is then moved to reduce the current until the noise just ceases, at which point the detector is in its most sensitive state.

It was found that strong atmospheric noise would render it insensitive, requiring that the device be rebiased after each strong burst of static interference.

== Sealed-point detector ==
Another form of electrolytic detector, the sealed-point electrolytic detector, which could stand considerable rough usage, was commercially known as the Radioson Detector; it had the cell sealed in a glass envelope. The operation was the same as in the bare-point electrolytic detector, the advantage being that the acid was sealed in, and consequently could not spill or evaporate.

== See also ==
- Hot-wire barretter
- Coherer
- Crystal Radio
- Spark-gap transmitter
- Radio receiver
- Antique radio
- Camille Papin Tissot
