= Édouard Branly =

French physicist and inventor (1844–1940)

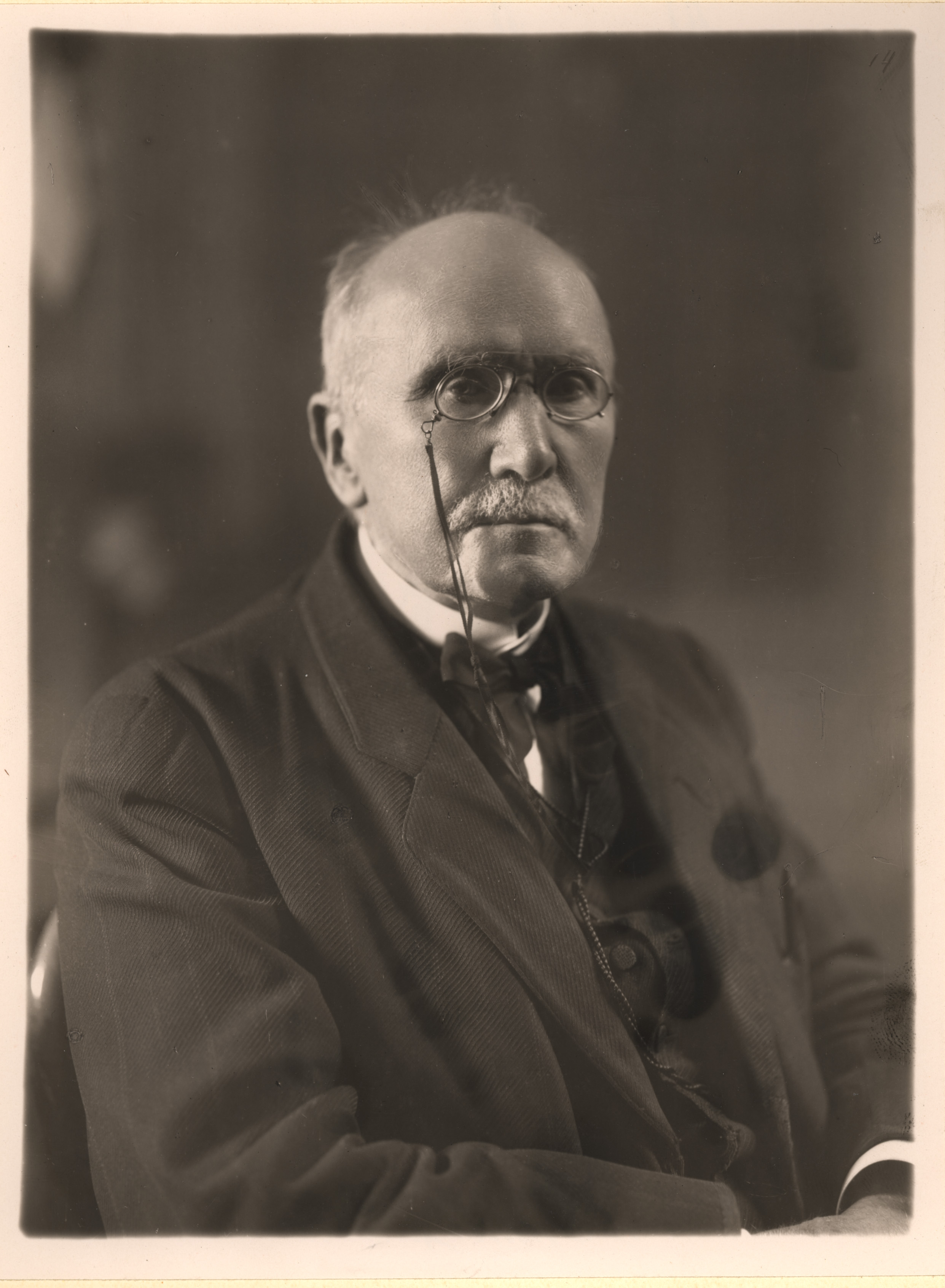
- Born: Édouard Eugène Désiré Branly; 23 October 1844; Amiens, Picardy, Kingdom of France
- Died: 24 March 1940 (aged 95); Paris, French Third Republic
- Resting place: Père Lachaise Cemetery, Paris
- Known for: Inventing the coherer
- Scientific career
- Fields: Physics
- Workplaces: Institut catholique de Paris

Édouard Eugène Désiré Branly (/ˈbrænli/, BRAN-lee; French: [edwaʁ bʁɑ̃li]; 23 October 1844 – 24 March 1940) was a French physicist and inventor known for his early involvement in wireless telegraphy and his invention of the coherer in 1890.

== Biography ==
He was born on 23 October 1844 and died on 24 March 1940. His funeral was at the Notre-Dame cathedral in Paris and was attended by the president of France, Albert Lebrun. He was interred in Père Lachaise Cemetery in Paris.

== Coherer ==
Temistocle Calzecchi-Onesti's experiments with tubes of metal filings, as reported in "Il Nuovo Cimento" in 1884, led to the development of the first radio wave detector, the coherer, by Branly some years later. It was the first widely used detector for radio communication. This consisted of iron filings contained in an insulating tube with two electrodes that will conduct an electric current under the action of an applied electrical signal. The operation of the coherer is based upon the large electrical contact resistance offered to the passage of electric current by loose metal filings, which decreases when direct current or alternating current is applied between the terminals of the coherer at a predetermined voltage. The mechanism is based on the thin layers of oxide covering all the filings, which is highly resistive. The oxide layers are broken down when a voltage is applied of the right magnitude, causing the coherer to "latch" into its low-resistance state until the voltage is removed and the coherer is physically tapped.

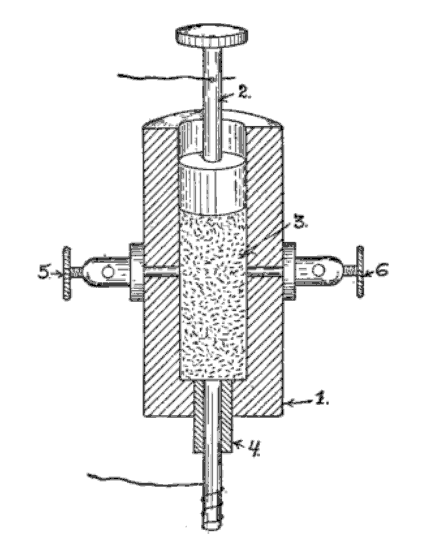
Branly's coherer

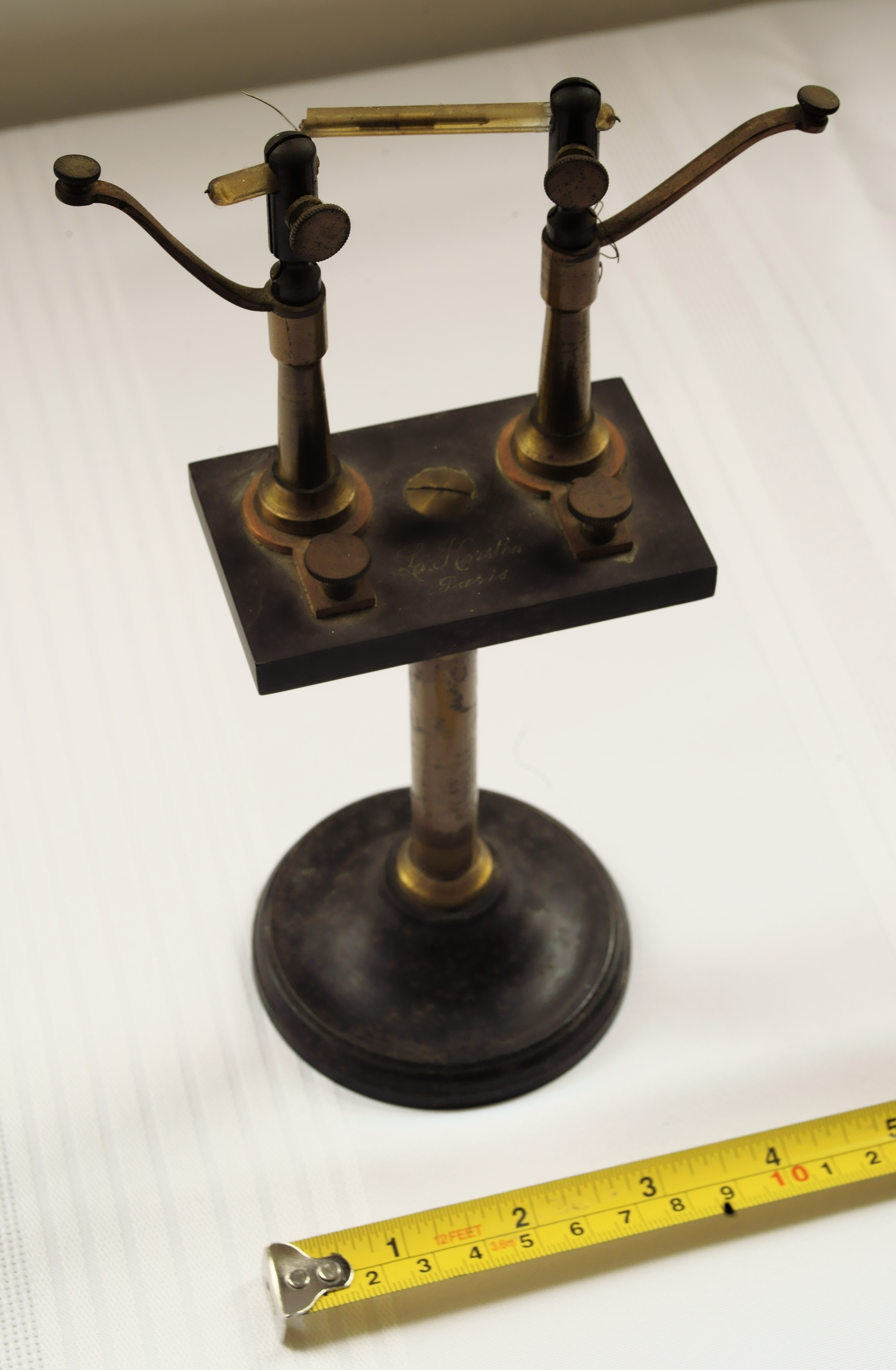
Original Branly tube (no. 78) for radiodetection

The coherer became the basis for radio reception, and remained in widespread use for about ten years, until about 1907. British radio pioneer Oliver Lodge made the coherer into a practical receiver by adding a "decoherer" which tapped the coherer after each reception to dislodge clumped filings, thus restoring the device's sensitivity. It was further developed by Guglielmo Marconi, then replaced about 1907 by crystal detectors.

In 1890, Branly demonstrated what he later called the "radio-conductor", which Lodge in 1893 named the coherer, the first sensitive device for detecting radio waves. Shortly after the experiments of Hertz, Dr. Branly discovered that loose metal filings, which in a normal state have a high electrical resistance, lose this resistance in the presence of electric oscillations and become practically conductors of electricity. This Branly showed by placing metal filings in a glass box or tube, and making them part of an ordinary electric circuit. According to the common explanation, when electric waves are set up in the neighborhood of this circuit, electromotive forces are generated in it which appear to bring the filings more closely together, that is, to cohere, and thus their electrical resistance decreases, from which cause this piece of apparatus was termed by Sir Oliver Lodge a coherer. Hence the receiving instrument, which may be a telegraph relay, that normally would not indicate any sign of current from the small battery, can be operated when electric oscillations are set up. Prof. Branly further found that when the filings had once cohered they retained their low resistance until shaken apart, for instance, by tapping on the tube.

In On the Changes in Resistance of Bodies under Different Electrical Conditions, he described how the electrical circuit was made by means of two narrow strips of copper parallel to the short sides of the rectangular plate, and forming good contact with it by means of screws. When the two copper strips were raised the plate was cut out of the circuit. He also used as conductors fine metallic filings, which he sometimes mixed with insulating liquids. The filings were placed in a tube of glass or ebonite, and were held between two metal plates. When the electrical circuit, consisting of a Daniell cell, a galvanometer of high resistance, and the metallic conductor, consisting of the ebonite plate, and the sheet of copper, or of the tube containing the filings, was completed, only a very small current flowed; but there was a sudden diminution of the resistance which was proved by a large deviation of the galvanometer needle when one or more electric discharges were produced in the neighbourhood of the circuit. In order to produce these discharges a small Wimshurst influence machine may be used, with or without a condenser, or a Ruhmkorff coil. The action of the electrical discharge diminishes as the distance increases; but he observed it easily, and without taking any special precautions, at a distance of several yards. By using a Wheatstone bridge, he observed this action at a distance of 20 yards, although the machine producing the sparks was working in a room separated from the galvanometer and the bridge by three large apartments, and the noise of the sparks was not audible. The changes of resistance were considerable with the conductors described. They varied, for instance, from several millions of ohms to 2000, or even to 100, from 150,000 to 500 ohms, from 50 to 35, and so on. The diminution of resistance was not momentary, and sometimes it was found to remain for twenty-four hours. Another method of making the test was, by connecting the electrodes of a capillary electrometer to the two poles of a Daniell cell with a sulphate of cadmium solution. The displacement of mercury which takes place when the cell is short-circuited, only takes place very slowly when an ebonite plate, covered with a sheet of copper of high resistance, is inserted between one of the poles of the cell, and the corresponding electrode of the electrometer; but when sparks are produced by a machine, the mercury is rapidly thrown into the capillary tube owing to the sudden diminution in the resistance of the plate.

Branly found that, upon examination of the conditions necessary to produce the phenomena, the following data:

- The circuit need not be closed to produce the result.
- The passage of an induced current in the body produces a similar effect to that of a spark at a distance.
- An induction-coil with two equal lengths of wire was used, a current is sent through the primary while the secondary forms part of a circuit containing the tube with filings and a galvanometer. The two induced currents caused the resistance of the filings to vary.
- When working with continuous currents the passage of a strong current lowers the resistance of the body for feeble currents.

Summing up, he stated that in all these tests the use of ebonite plates covered with copper or mixtures of copper and tin was less satisfactory than the use of filings; with the plates he was unable to obtain the initial resistance of the body after the action of the spark or of the current, while with the tubes and filings the resistance could be brought back to its normal value by striking a few sharp blows on the support of the tube.

== Honours ==
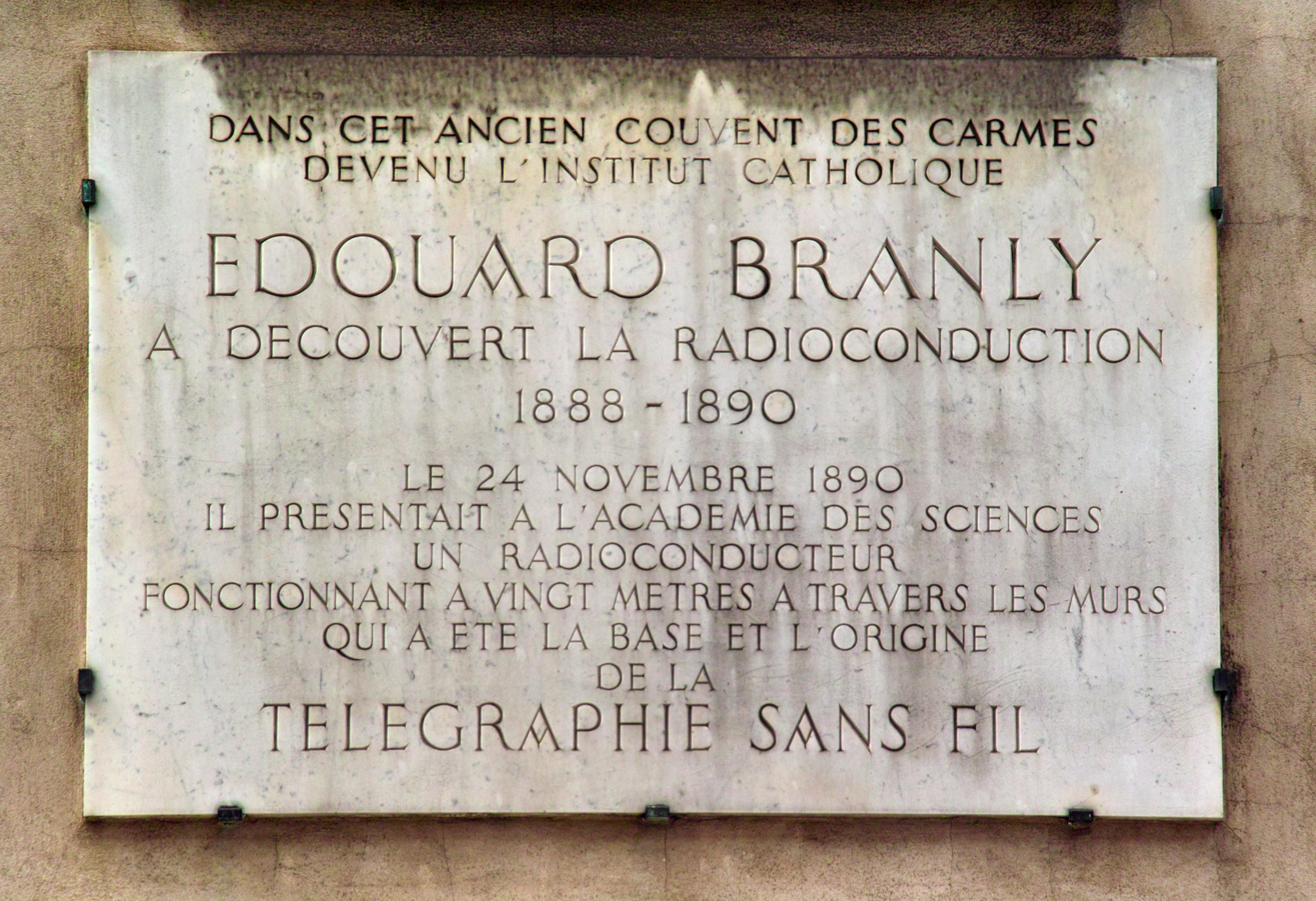
Plaque at the Musée Édouard Branly on rue d'Assas in Paris

Branly was nominated thrice for a Nobel Prize, but never received it. In 1911, he was elected to the French Academy of Sciences, winning over his rival Marie Curie. Both had opponents in the Academy: she a female and he a devout catholic, who had left Sorbonne for a chair in the Catholic University of Paris. Branly eventually won the election by two votes. In 1936 he was elected to the Pontifical Academy of Sciences.

Branly was named as Marconi's inspiration during the first radio communication across the English Channel, when Marconi's message was: "Mr. Marconi sends to Mr. Branly his regards over the Channel through the wireless telegraph, this nice achievement being partly the result of Mr. Branly's remarkable work."

Branly's discovery of radioconduction was named an IEEE Milestone in Electrical Engineering and Computing in 2010.

== Legacy ==
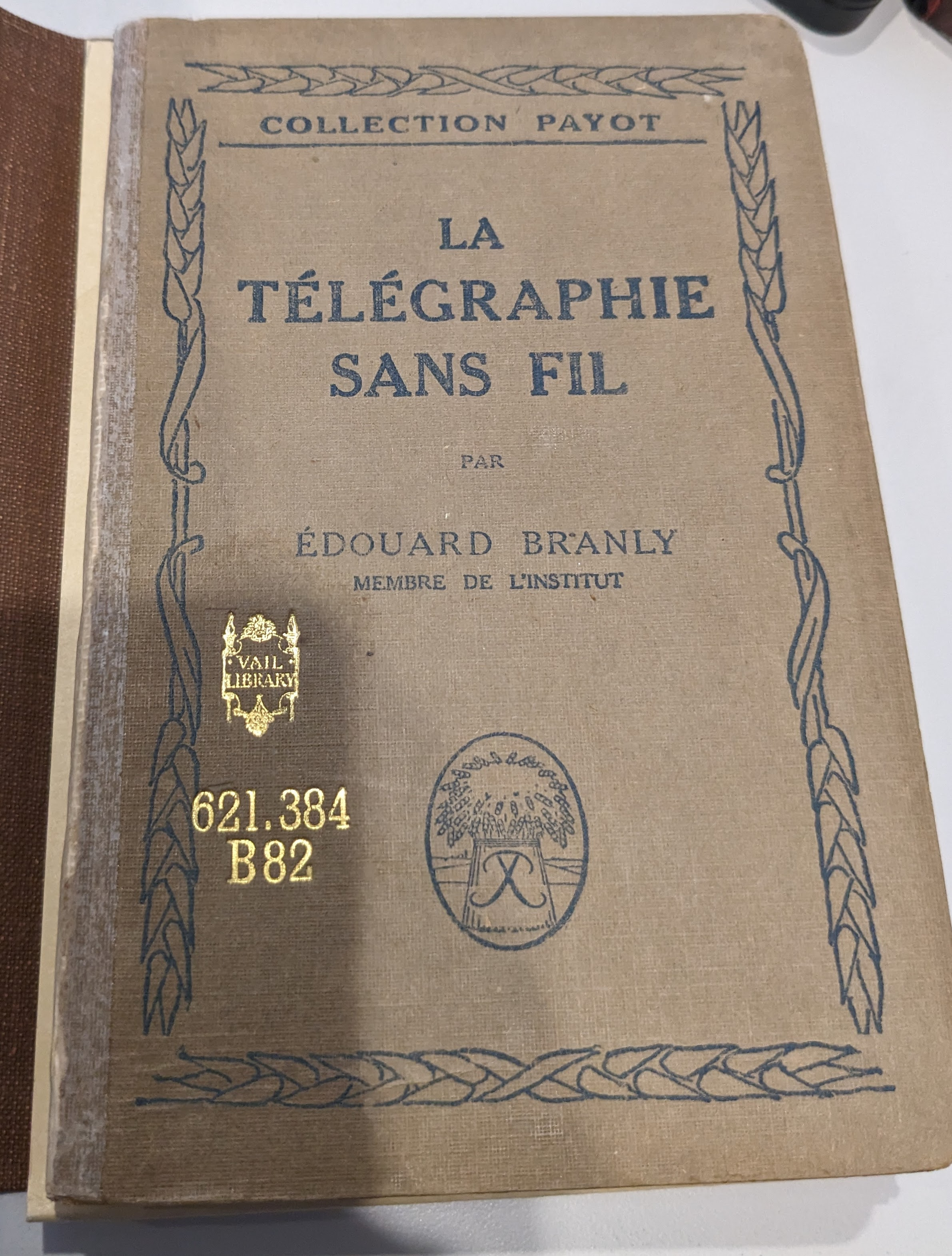
Cover of "La télégraphie sans fil", 1922

The quai Branly – a road that runs alongside the River Seine in Paris – is named after Branly. It is the name of this road, not of Branly himself, that led to the naming of the Musée du quai Branly.

Branly is also commemorated by a technical High School (lycée) in Châtellerault, a commune in the Vienne department in the Poitou-Charentes region.

== See also ==
- Musée Édouard Branly, which preserves his laboratory
- Radio: History of radio, Invention of radio
- People: Alexander Stepanovich Popov, Karl Ferdinand Braun
- U.S. patent 796,800 : "Receiver for use in wireless telegraphy" Edouard Branly, 1905

== External links and resources ==
Media related to Édouard Branly at Wikimedia Commons

- Eugenii Katz, "Edouard Eugène Désiré Branly". The history of electrochemistry, electricity and electronics; Biosensors & Bioelectronics.
- "Édouard Branly". Robert Appleton Company, The Catholic Encyclopedia, Volume II, 1907.
- "Edouard Eugène Désiré Branly"". Adventures in Cybersound.
