= Temistocle Calzecchi-Onesti =

Italian physicist and inventor

Temistocle Calzecchi Onesti
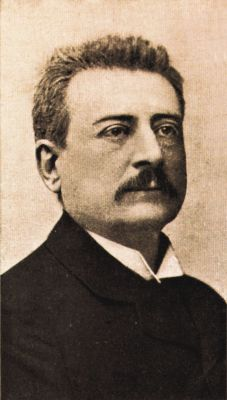
- Born: 14 December 1853; Lapedona, Italy
- Died: 25 November 1922 (aged 68); Monterubbiano, Italy
- Occupation(s): physicist, mathematician, inventor
- Parent: father: Icilio

Temistocle Calzecchi Onesti (14 December 1853 – 25 November 1922) was an Italian physicist and inventor born in Lapedona, Italy, where his father, Icilio Calzecchi, a medical doctor from nearby Monterubbiano, was temporarily working at the time. His mother, Angela, was the last descendant of the ancient and noble Onesti family. His first name is the Italian version of the Athenian general Themistocles.

Calzecchi demonstrated in experiments in 1884 through 1886 that iron filings contained in an insulating tube will conduct an electric current under the action of an electromagnetic wave. This discovery was the operating principle behind an early radio wave detector device called the coherer, developed about 6–10 years later by Oliver Lodge, Edouard Branly, and Guglielmo Marconi, which was influential in the development of radio.

== Life and work ==
Monterubbiano was his home, where he spent his youth, studied, and spent other periods of his life, and died.

Calzecchi graduated from the University of Pisa after studying the physical sciences and mathematics, then devoted himself to teaching in high schools and then scientific research.

On 6 December 1879 he was appointed Professor of Physics at the Istituto tecnico at L'Aquila. In 1883 he transferred to the Liceo Classico "A. Caro" in Fermo. In 1884 he began his studies of electrical resistance and conductivity of metal filings. In 1886, he founded a Physics Laboratory at the High School, including a meteorological observatory, at the expense of the City of Fermo and the Central Office of Meteorology and Geodynamics, organizing a weather information service for the region. In 1888 he moved to the Beccaria school in Milan as a teacher of physics.

In 1889 Calzecchi assisted the famous physicist Galileo Ferraris, testing the installation of electric lighting in Fermo. Meanwhile, the great physics discoveries of Heinrich Hertz, Wilhelm Conrad Röntgen, Nicola Tesla and Augusto Righi were made, including the transmission of telegraph signals without wires. Since 1884 Calzecchi had been researching the properties of metal powders, finding high electrical conductivity due to various excitations such as extra current, lightning, electrostatic induction, etc. Calzecchi's experiments with tubes of metal filings led to the development of the first radio wave detector, the coherer, in 1890 by Edouard Branly.

This unit consists of a glass tube containing powder and nickel silver with traces of mercury, placed between two steel electrodes in vacuum. When it is hit by electromagnetic fields, the high resistance of the powder becomes relatively low until it is "percussed"—that is, hit, to break the welded bonds between the particles. These studies by Calzecchi predate by nearly six years those of the French physicist Edouard Branly and Oliver Lodge in England, although they are largely credited with the discovery. At the time, Calzecchi saw this as an invention for detecting lightning and as a seismic detector, but a lively debate followed when Branly, Lodge and Marconi used the coherer for radio.
