= Roy Alexander Weagant =

Canadian-American radio pioneer (1881–1942)

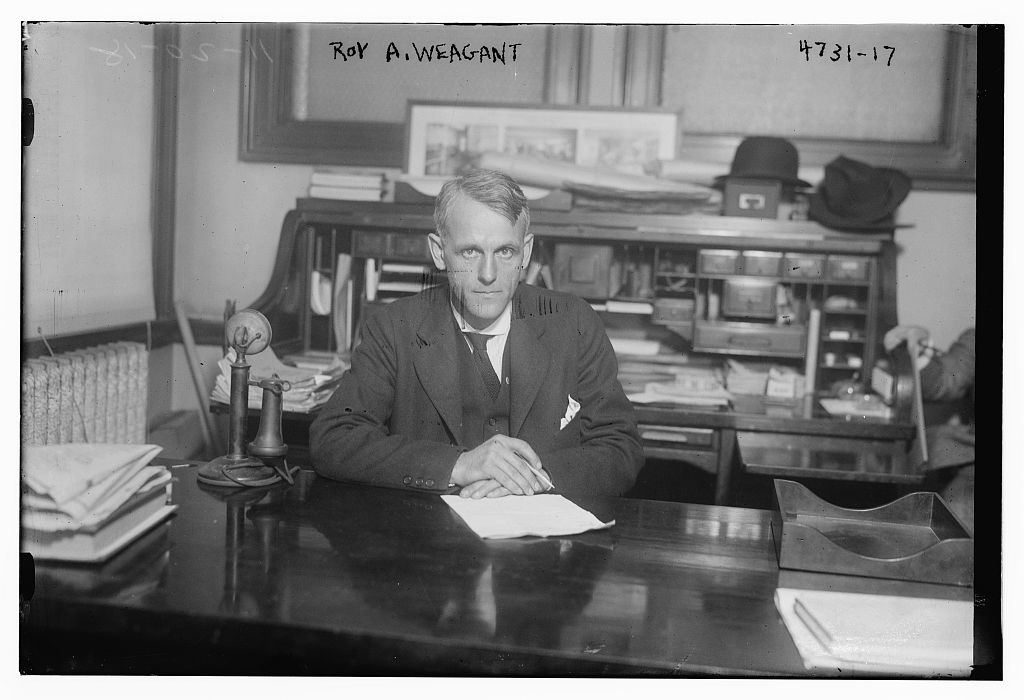

Roy Alexander Weagant (March 29, 1881 – August 23, 1942) was a Canadian–American radio pioneer.

== Biography ==
Weagant was born in Morrisburg, Ontario, and at age 4 moved to Derby Line, Vermont. He attended preparatory school and college in Stanstead, Quebec, then McGill University, Montreal, where he saw demonstrations by Sir Ernest Rutherford, and from which he graduated with a BS degree in 1905. After graduation he worked in turn for the Montreal Light and Power Company, the Western Electric Company in New York City and then Pittsburgh, the General Electric Company at West Lynn, Massachusetts, and in 1907 the DeLaval Steam Turbine Company at Trenton, New Jersey.

When Reginald Fessenden contracted with the company for a steam turbine, Weagant applied for a job, and from 1908 to 1915 worked at Fessenden's National Electric Signaling Company's station at Brant Rock, Massachusetts, working on the design of the 100-kilowatt spark transmitter for the United States Navy's first high-power station at Arlington, Virginia.

In 1915, Weagant joined the Marconi Wireless Telegraph Company of America as a designer, and subsequently became its chief engineer. There he invented the first attempts to avoid infringement of Lee De Forest's audion tube, by means of a Fleming valve with filament and plate. During World War I, Weagant led design of much of the United States Navy's radio equipment.

In 1918 Weagant became famous for "eliminating" static in radio transmissions, inventing the first successful system for reducing its effects, and from 1920 to 1924 was a consulting engineer at RCA attempting to eliminating static, including a winter of 1921–1922 in Bermuda which passed without success. However he did develop directional antennas and other devices that reduced static in transatlantic radio communications. He left RCA in 1924, joining with De Forest in research work, finally in 1925 retired to Lake Memphremagog, Vermont.

He died on August 23, 1942, in Sherbrooke, Quebec.

== Legacy ==
Some of his papers are now archived in the Lemelson Center, Smithsonian Institution. Weagant served on the Institute of Radio Engineers board in 1914, and was awarded its 1920 IEEE Morris N. Liebmann Memorial Award.

== Selected works ==
- "Some Recent Marconi Sets", The Wireless Age, Vol. 1, No. 7, April 1914.
