= Wollaston wire =

Fine platinum wire clad in silver

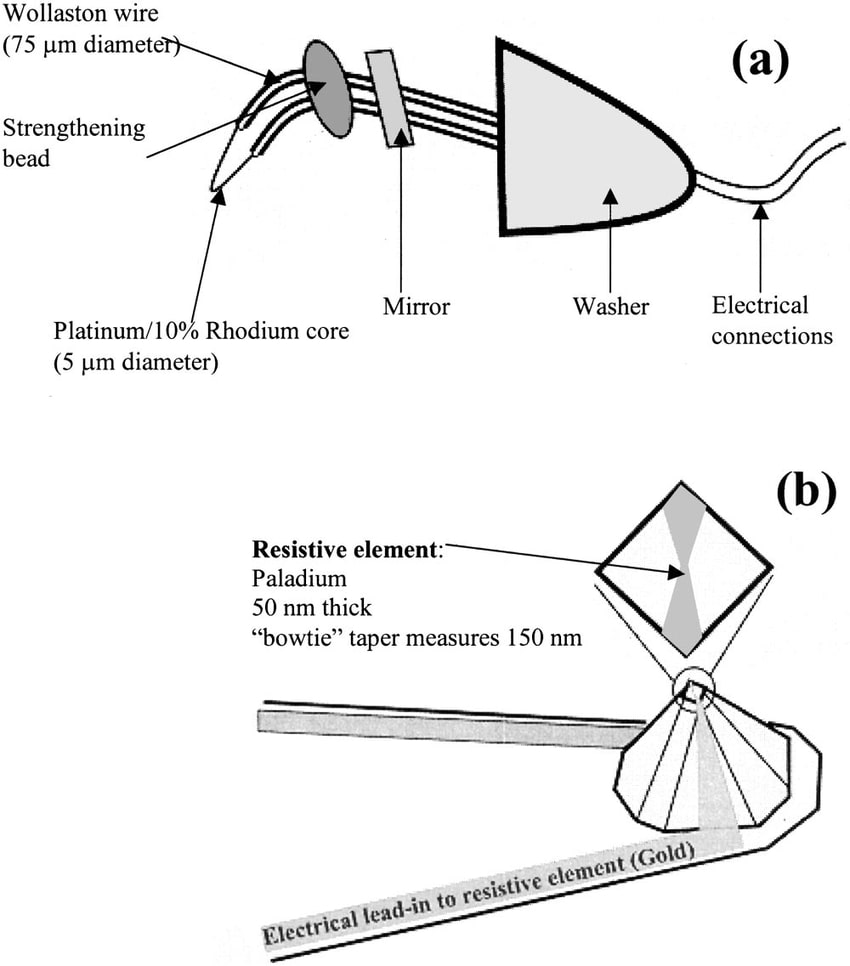
Schematic diagram of the Wollaston wire a and the micromachined b probes

Wollaston wire is a very fine (c. 0.001 mm thick) platinum wire clad in silver and used in electrical instruments. For most uses, the silver cladding is etched away by acid to expose the platinum core.

== History ==
The wire is named after its inventor, William Hyde Wollaston, who first produced it in England in the early 19th century. Platinum wire is drawn through successively smaller dies until it is about 0.003 inches (0.076 mm, 40 AWG) in diameter. It is then embedded in the middle of a silver wire having a diameter of about 0.100 inches (2.5 mm, 10 AWG). This composite wire is then drawn until the silver wire has a diameter of about 0.002 inches (0.051 mm, 44 AWG), causing the embedded platinum wire to be reduced by the same 50:1 ratio to a final diameter of 0.00006 inches (1.5 μm, 74 AWG). Removal of the silver coating with an acid bath leaves the fine platinum wire as a product of the process.

== Uses ==
Wollaston wire was used in early radio detectors known as electrolytic detectors and the hot wire barretter. Other uses include suspension of delicate devices, sensing of temperature, and sensitive electrical power measurements.

It continues to be used for the fastest-responding hot-wire anemometers.
