= Hot-wire barretter =

Early radio equipment

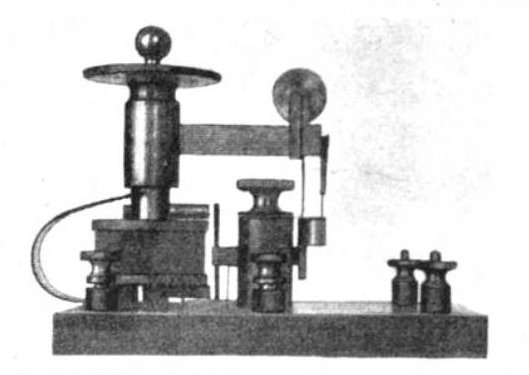
Fessenden barretter

The hot-wire barretter was a demodulating detector, invented in 1902 by Reginald Fessenden, that found limited use in early radio receivers. In effect, it was a highly sensitive thermoresistor, which could demodulate amplitude-modulated signals, something that the coherer (the standard detector of the time) could not do.

The first device used to demodulate amplitude modulated signals, it was later superseded by the electrolytic detector, also generally attributed to Fessenden. The barretter principle is still used as a detector for microwave radiation, similar to a bolometer.

== Description and construction ==
Fessenden's 1902 patent describes the construction of the device. A fine platinum wire, about 0.003 inches (0.08 mm) in diameter, is embedded in the middle of a silver tube having a diameter of about 0.1 inches (2.5 mm). This compound wire is then drawn until the silver wire has a diameter of about 0.002 inches (0.05 mm); as the platinum wire within it is reduced in the same ratio, it is drawn down to a final diameter of 0.00006 inches (1.5 μm). The result is called Wollaston wire.

The silver cladding is etched off a short piece of the composite wire, leaving an extremely fine platinum wire; this is supported, on two heavier silver wires, in a loop inside a glass bulb. The leads are taken out through the glass envelope, and the whole device is put under vacuum and then sealed.

== Operation ==
The hot-wire barretter depends upon the increase of a metal resistivity with increasing temperature. The device is biased by a direct current adjusted to heat the wire to its most sensitive temperature. When there is an oscillating current from the antenna through the extremely fine platinum wire loop, the wire is further heated as the current increases and cools as the current decreases again. As the wire heats and cools, it varies its resistance in response to the signals passing through it. Because of the low thermal mass of the wire, it is capable of responding quickly enough to vary its resistance in response to audio signals. However, it cannot vary its resistance fast enough to respond to the much higher radio frequencies. The signal is demodulated because the current supplied by the biasing source varies with the changing wire resistance. Headphones are connected in series with the DC circuit, and the variations in the current are rendered as sound.

== See also ==
- Electrolytic detector a development of the barretter detector.
- Iron-hydrogen resistor
