= Audion =

Electronic detecting or amplifying vacuum tube

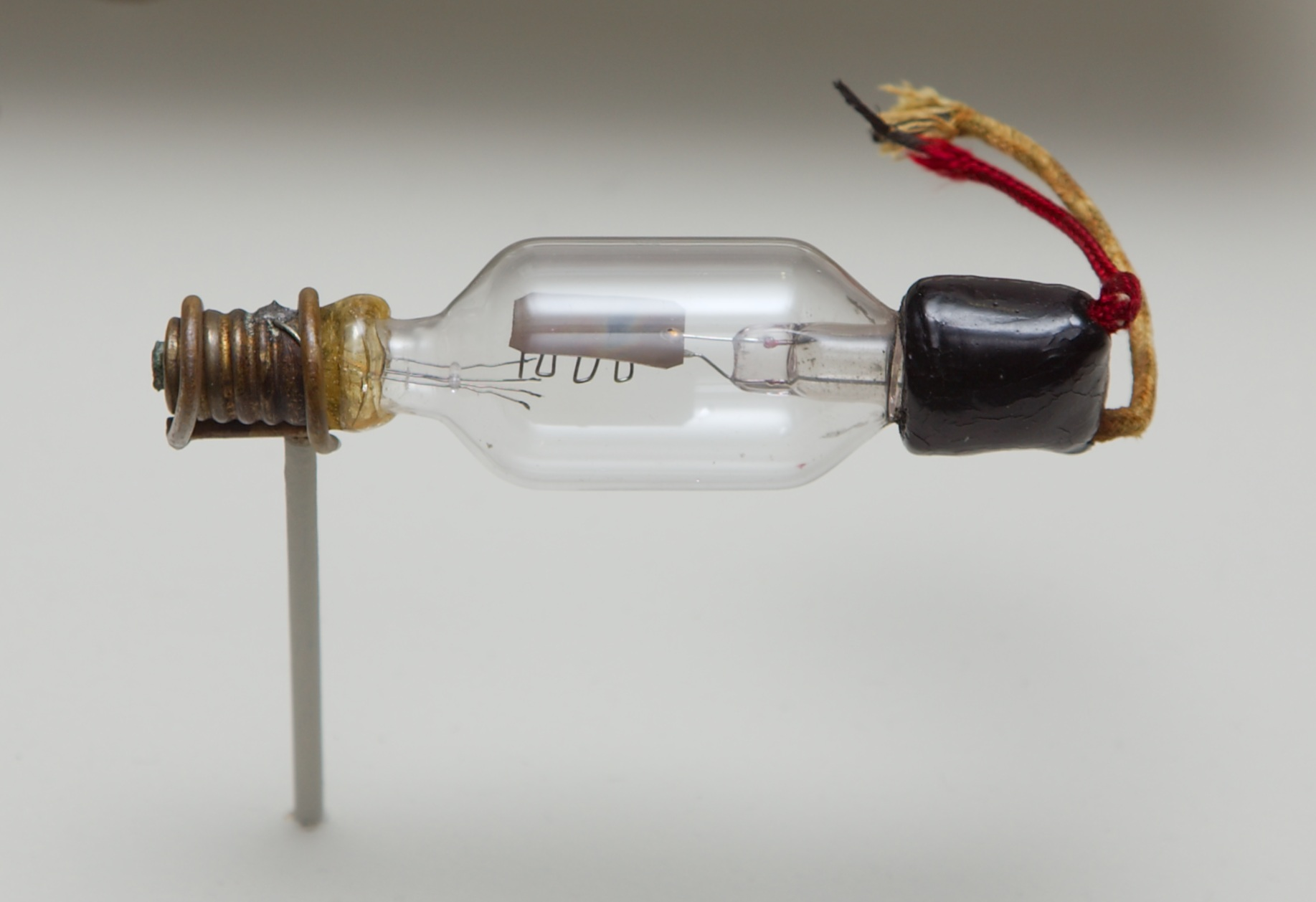
Triode Audion vacuum tube from 1908. The filament (which was also the cathode) was at the lower left inside the tube, but has burned out and is no longer present. The filament's connecting and supporting wires are visible. The plate is at the middle top, and the grid is the serpentine electrode below it. The plate and grid connections leave the tube at the right.

The Audion is an electronic detecting or amplifying vacuum tube invented by American electrical engineer Lee de Forest as a diode in 1906. Improved, it was patented as the first triode in 1908, consisting of an evacuated glass tube containing three electrodes: a heated filament (the cathode, made out of tantalum), a grid, and a plate (the anode). It is important in the history of technology because it was the first widely used electronic device that could amplify. A low power signal at the grid could control much more power in the plate circuit.

Audions had more residual gas than later vacuum tubes; the residual gas limited the dynamic range and gave the Audion non-linear characteristics and erratic performance. Originally developed as a radio receiver detector by adding a grid electrode to the Fleming valve, it found little use until its amplifying ability was recognized around 1912 by several researchers, who used it to build the first amplifying radio receivers and electronic oscillators. The many practical applications for amplification motivated its rapid development, and the original Audion was superseded within a few years by improved versions with a higher vacuum.

== History ==
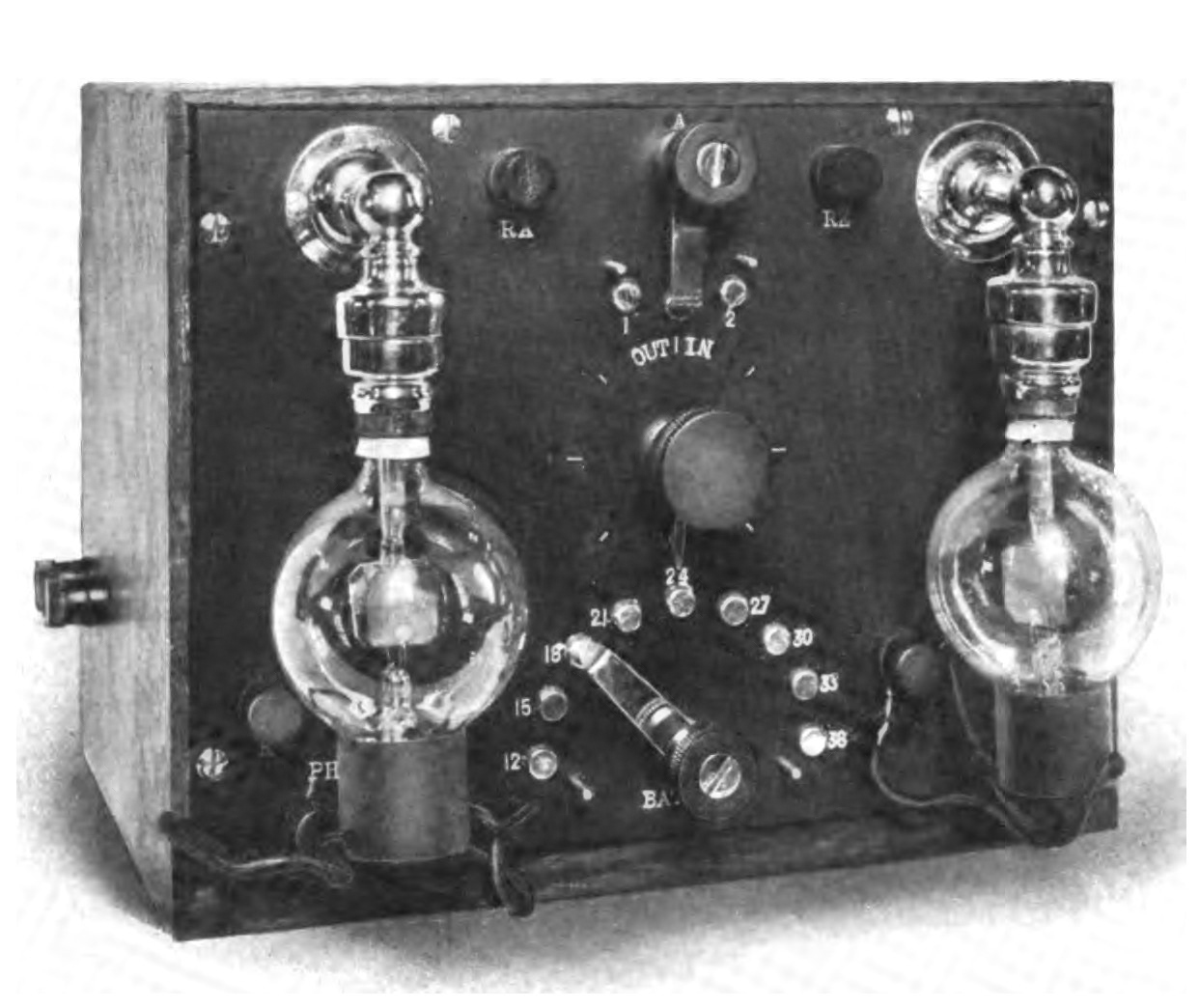
An Audion radio receiver by de Forest. The Audion tubes were mounted upside down to prevent the delicate filaments from sagging and touching the grids. This receiver provided the ability to choose operation of either one of the two provided detector tubes.

It had been known since the middle of the 19th century that gas flames were electrically conductive, and early wireless experimenters had noticed that this conductivity was affected by the presence of radio waves. De Forest found that gas in a partial vacuum heated by a conventional lamp filament behaved much the same way, and that if a wire were wrapped around the glass housing, the device could serve as a detector of radio signals. In his original design, a small metal plate was sealed into the lamp housing, and this was connected to the positive terminal of a 22–volt battery via a pair of headphones, the negative terminal being connected to one side of the lamp filament. When wireless signals were applied to the wire wrapped around the outside of the glass, they caused disturbances in the current which produced sounds in the headphones.

This was a significant development as existing commercial wireless systems were heavily protected by patents; a new type of detector would allow de Forest to market his own system. He eventually discovered that connecting the antenna circuit to a third electrode placed directly in the space current path greatly improved the sensitivity; in his earliest versions, this was simply a piece of wire bent into the shape of a gridiron (hence grid).

The Audion provided power gain; with other detectors, all of the power to operate the headphones had to come from the antenna circuit itself. Consequently, weak transmitters could be heard at greater distances.

=== Patents and disputes ===
De Forest and everybody else at the time greatly underestimated the potential of his grid Audion, imagining it to be limited to mostly military applications. It is significant that de Forest apparently did not see its potential as a telephone repeater amplifier at the time he filed the patent claiming it, even though he had previously patented amplification devices and crude electromechanical note magnifiers had been the bane of the telephone industry for at least two decades. (Ironically, in the years of patent disputes leading up to World War I, it was only this "loophole" that allowed vacuum triodes to be manufactured at all since de Forest's grid Audion patent did not mention this application).

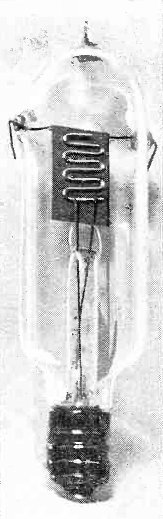
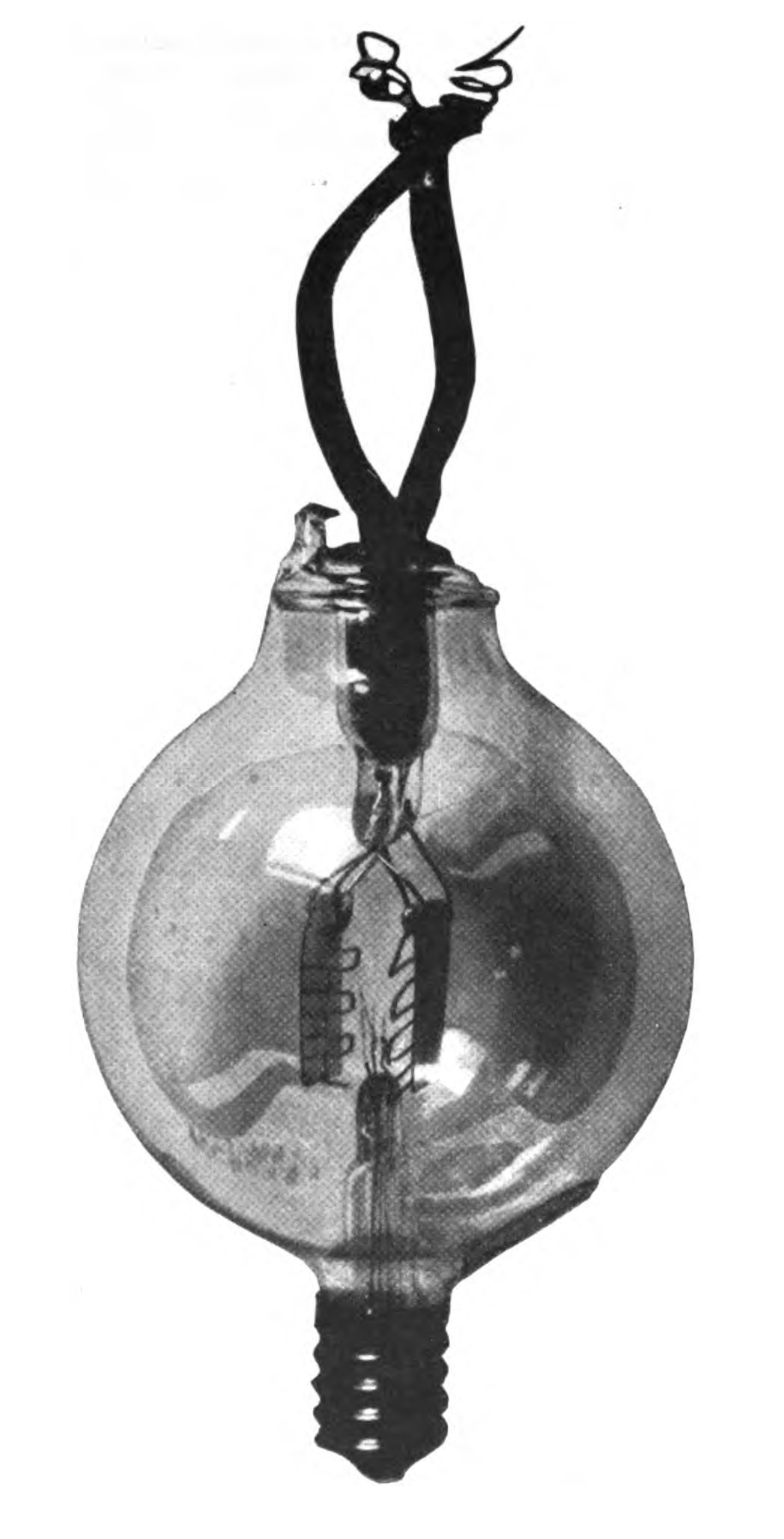
(left) The first prototype Audion with the grid (zigzag wires) between the filament and plate. (right) Later design of an audion tube. The grid and plate are in two parts on either side of the central filament. In both these tubes the filament is burned out.

De Forest was granted a patent for his early two-electrode diode version of the Audion on November 13, 1906 (U.S. patent 841,386), and the "triode" (three-electrode) version was patented in 1908 (U.S. patent 879,532). De Forest continued to claim that he developed the Audion independently from John Ambrose Fleming's earlier research on the thermionic valve (for which Fleming received Great Britain patent 24850 and the American Fleming valve patent U.S. patent 803,684), and de Forest became embroiled in many radio-related patent disputes. De Forest was famous for saying that he "didn't know why it worked, it just did".

He always referred to the vacuum triodes developed by other researchers as "Oscillaudions", although there is no evidence that he had any significant input to their development. It is true that after the invention of the true vacuum triode in 1913 (see below), de Forest continued to manufacture various types of radio transmitting and receiving apparatus, (examples of which are illustrated on this page). However, although he routinely described these devices as using "Audions", they actually used high-vacuum triodes, using circuitry very similar to that developed by other experimenters.

In 1914, Columbia University student Edwin Howard Armstrong worked with professor John Harold Morecroft to document the electrical principles of the Audion. Armstrong published his explanation of the Audion in Electrical World in December 1914, complete with circuit diagrams and oscilloscope graphs. In March and April 1915, Armstrong spoke to the Institute of Radio Engineers in New York and Boston, respectively, presenting his paper "Some Recent Developments in the Audion Receiver", which was published in September. A combination of the two papers was reprinted in other journals such as the Annals of the New York Academy of Sciences. When Armstrong and de Forest later faced each other in a dispute over the regeneration patent, Armstrong was able to demonstrate conclusively that de Forest still had no idea how it worked.

The problem was that (possibly to distance his invention from the Fleming valve) de Forest's original patents specified that low-pressure gas inside the Audion was essential to its operation (Audion being a contraction of "Audio-Ion"), and in fact early Audions had severe reliability problems due to this gas being adsorbed by the metal electrodes. The Audions sometimes worked extremely well; at other times they would barely work at all.

As well as de Forest himself, numerous researchers had tried to find ways to improve the reliability of the device by stabilizing the partial vacuum. Much of the research that led to the development of true vacuum tubes was carried out by Irving Langmuir in the General Electric (GE) research laboratories.

=== Kenotron and Pliotron ===
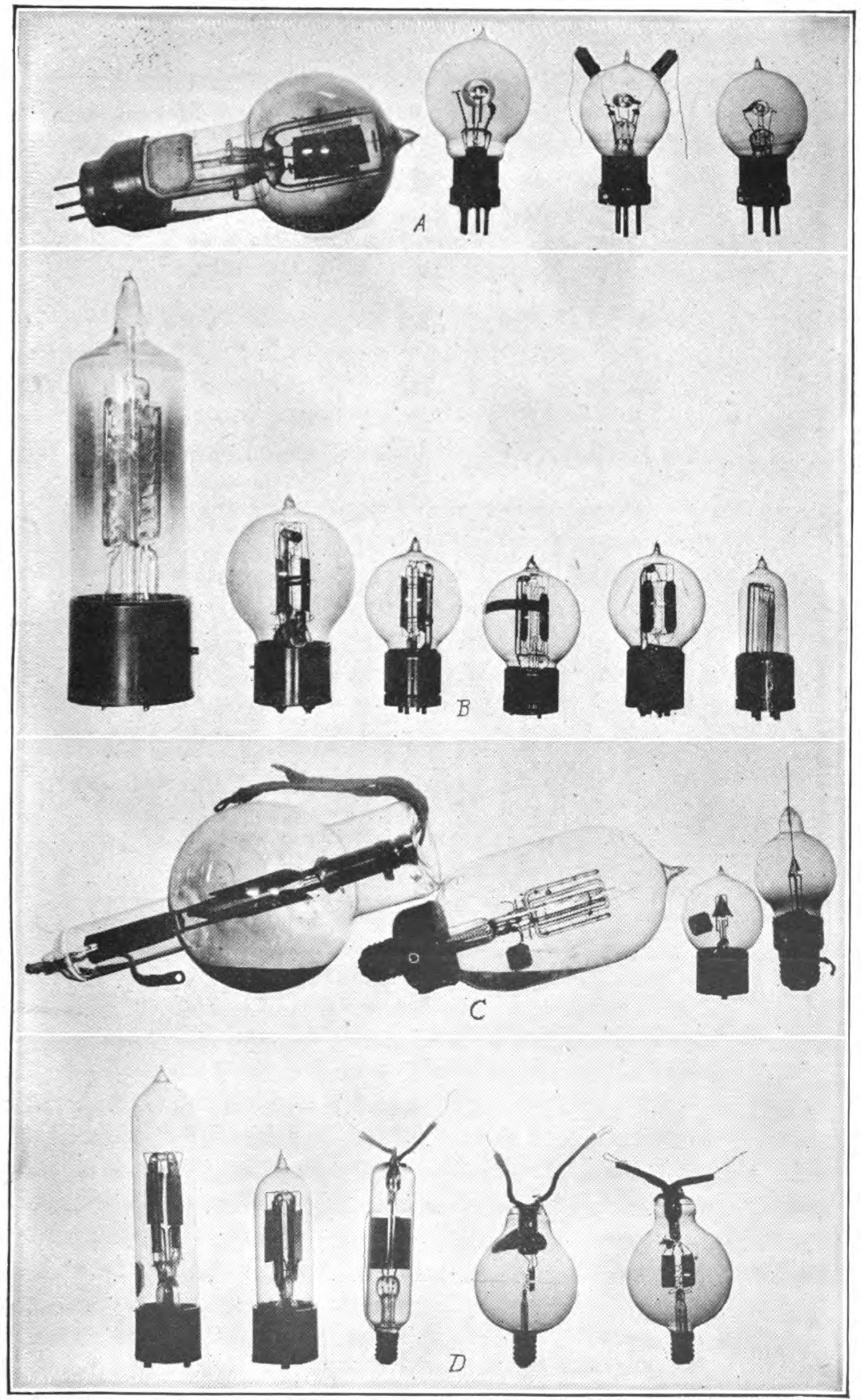
Audions and early triodes developed from them, 1918: Bottom row (D): De Forest Audions and oscillaudions; Third row (C): Pliotrons, developed at General Electric by Langmuir; Second row (B): triodes developed at Western Electric which bought the rights from de Forest in 1913.; Top row (A): French triodes. The French government gained the right to manufacture Audions in 1912 when de Forest failed to renew his French patents for lack of $125.

Langmuir had long suspected that certain assumed limitations on the performance of various low-pressure and vacuum electrical devices, might not be fundamental physical limitations at all, but simply due to contamination and impurities in the manufacturing process. His first success was in demonstrating that, contrary to what Edison and others had long asserted, incandescent lamps could function more efficiently and with longer life if the glass envelope was filled with low-pressure inert gas rather than a complete vacuum. However, this only worked if the gas used was meticulously 'scrubbed" of all traces of oxygen and water vapor. He then applied the same approach to producing a rectifier for the newly developed "Coolidge" X-ray tubes. Again contrary to what had been widely believed to be possible, by virtue of meticulous cleanliness and attention to detail, he was able to produce versions of the Fleming Diode that could rectify hundreds of thousands of volts. His rectifiers were called "Kenotrons" from the Greek keno (empty, contains nothing, as in a vacuum) and tron (device, instrument).

He then turned his attention to the Audion tube, again suspecting that its notoriously unpredictable behaviour might be tamed with more care in the manufacturing process.

However he took a somewhat unorthodox approach. Instead of trying to stabilize the partial vacuum, he wondered if it was possible to make the Audion function with the total vacuum of a Kenotron, since that was somewhat easier to stabilize.

He soon realized that his "vacuum" Audion had markedly different characteristics from the de Forest version, and was really a quite different device, capable of linear amplification and at much higher frequencies. To distinguish his device from the Audion he named it the "Pliotron", from the Greek plio (more or extra, in this sense meaning gain, more signal coming out than went in).

Essentially, he referred to all his vacuum tube designs as Kenotrons, the Pliotron basically being a specialized type of Kenotron. However, because Pliotron and Kenotron were registered trademarks, technical writers tended to use the more generic term "vacuum tube". By the mid-1920s, the term "Kenotron" had come to exclusively refer to vacuum tube rectifiers, while the term "Pliotron" had fallen into disuse. Ironically, in popular usage, the sound-alike brands "Radiotron" and "Ken-Rad" outlasted the original names.

== Applications and use ==
De Forest continued to manufacture and supply Audions to the US Navy up until the early 1920s, for maintenance of existing equipment, but elsewhere they were regarded as well and truly obsolete by then. It was the vacuum triode that made practical radio broadcasts a reality.

Prior to the introduction of the Audion, radio receivers had used a variety of detectors including coherers, barretters, and crystal detectors. The most popular crystal detector consisted of a small piece of galena crystal probed by a fine wire commonly referred to as a "cat's-whisker detector". They were very unreliable, requiring frequent adjustment of the cat's whisker and offered no amplification. Such systems usually required the user to listen to the signal through headphones, sometimes at very low volume, as the only energy available to operate the headphones was that picked up by the antenna. For long distance communication huge antennas were normally required, and enormous amounts of electrical power had to be fed into the transmitter.

The Audion was a considerable improvement on this, but the original devices could not provide any subsequent amplification to what was produced in the signal detection process. The later vacuum triodes allowed the signal to be amplified to any desired level, typically by feeding the amplified output of one triode into the grid of the next, eventually providing more than enough power to drive a full-sized speaker. Apart from this, they were able to amplify the incoming radio signals prior to the detection process, making it work much more efficiently.

Vacuum tubes could also be used to make superior radio transmitters. The combination of much more efficient transmitters and much more sensitive receivers revolutionized radio communication during World War I.

By the late 1920s such "tube radios" began to become a fixture of most Western world households, and remained so until long after the introduction of transistor radios in the mid-1950s.

In modern electronics, the vacuum tube has been largely superseded by solid state devices such as the transistor, invented in 1947 and implemented in integrated circuits in 1959, although vacuum tubes remain to this day in such applications as high-powered transmitters, guitar amplifiers and some high fidelity audio equipment.

Application images

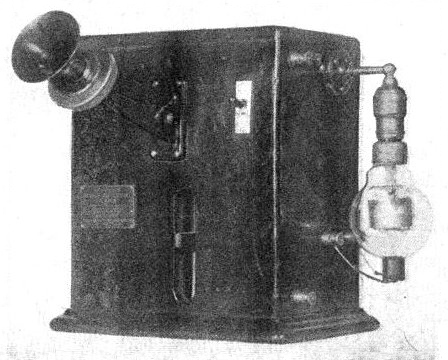
The first Audion AM radio transmitter, built by Lee de Forest and announced April, 1914

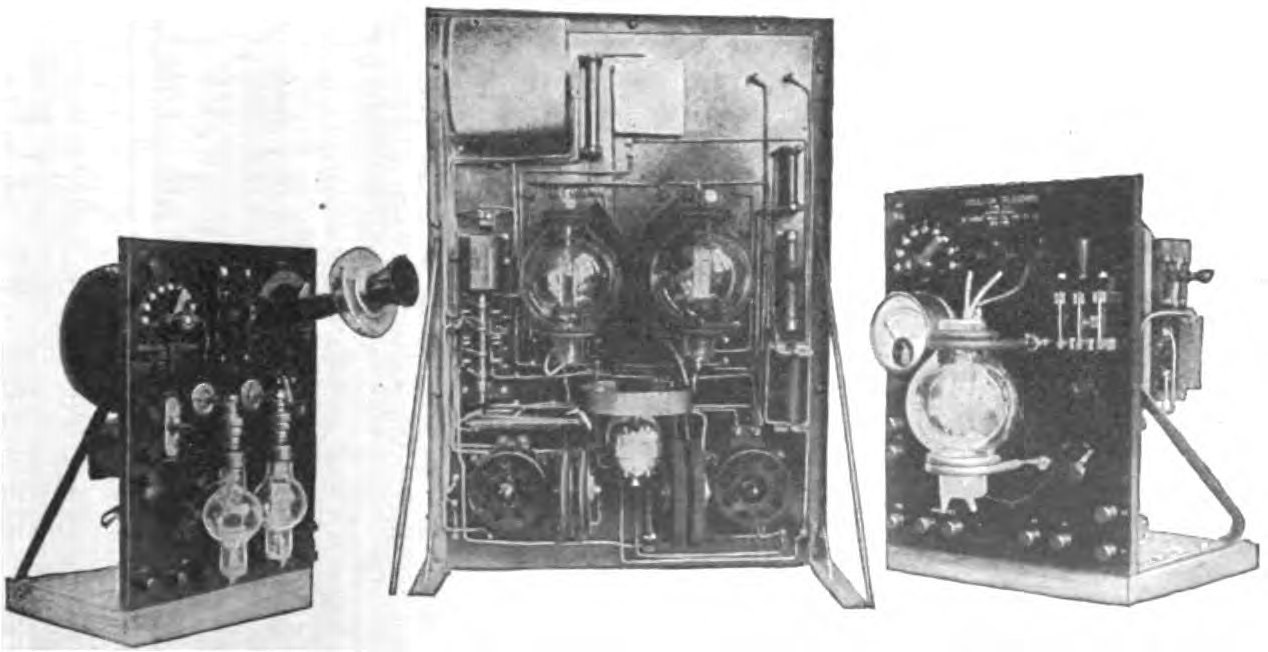
Some of the earliest Audion AM radio transmitters, built by de Forest around 1916. The invention of the Audion oscillator in 1912 made inexpensive sound radio transmission possible, and was responsible for the advent of radio broadcasting around 1920.

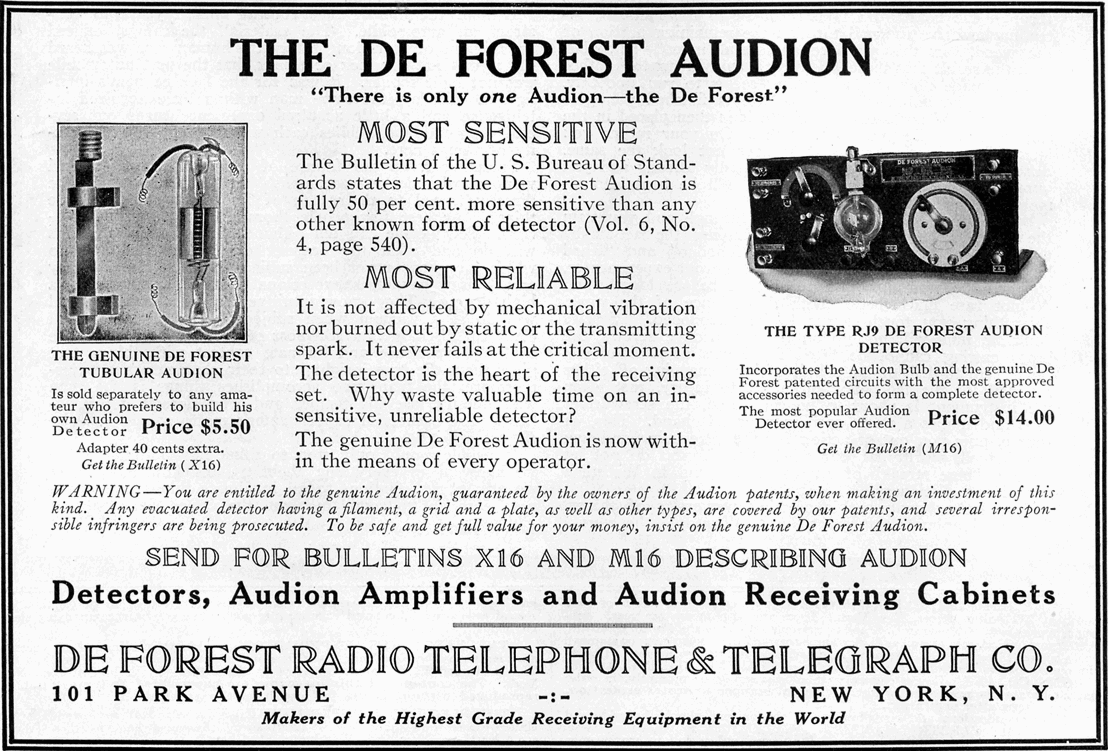
Audion advertisement, Electrical Experimenter magazine, 1916
