= Monterubbiano =

- Comune
- Comune di Monterubbiano
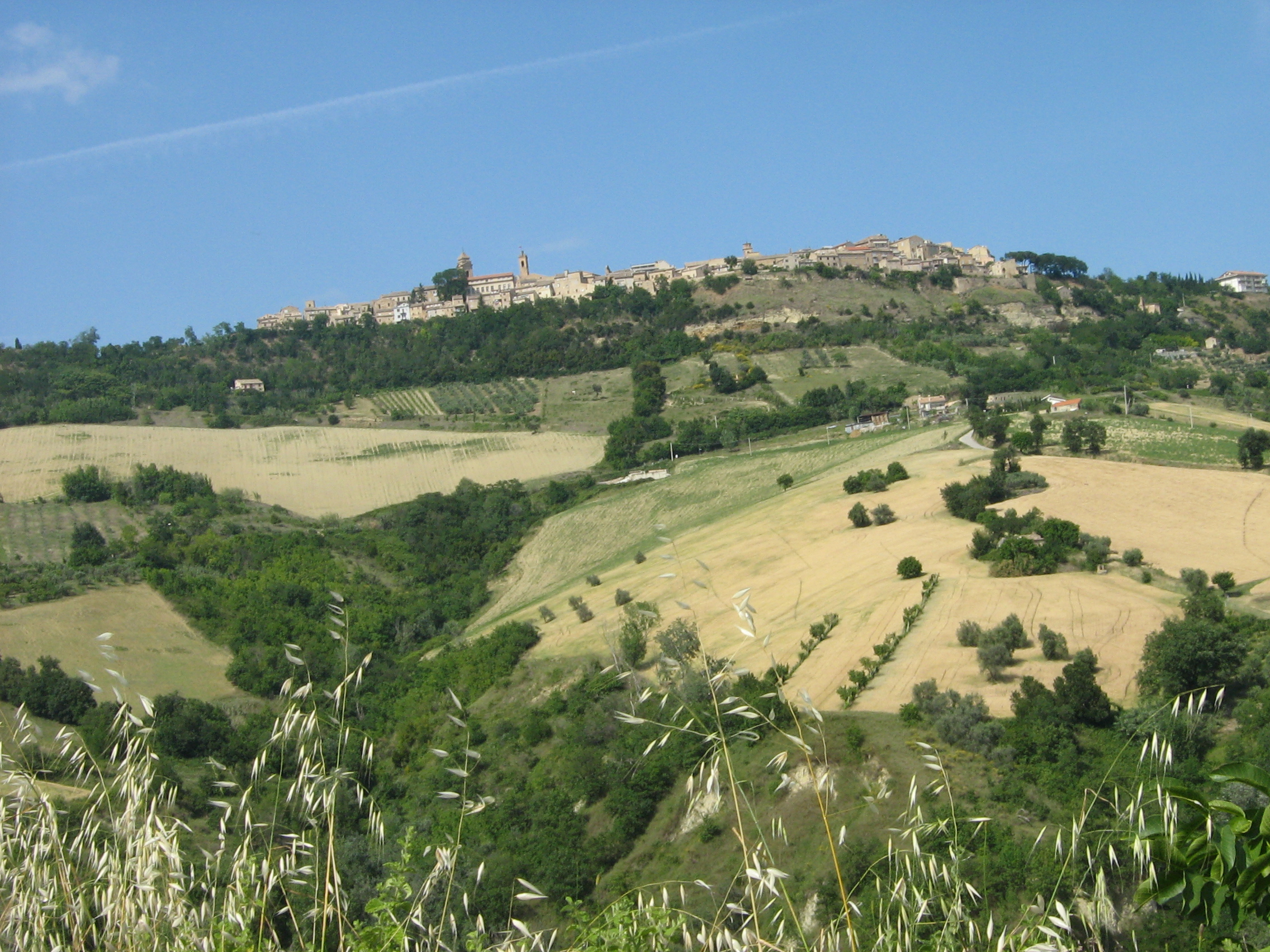

- Location within Italy Location within Marche
- Coordinates: 43°05′N 13°43′E
- Country: Italy
- Region: Marche
- Province: Fermo (FM)
- Frazioni: Chiesanuova, Montotto, Rubbianello

Government
  - Mayor: Meri Marziali

Area
  - Total: 32.12 km^{2} (12.40 sq mi)
- Elevation: 463 m (1,519 ft)

Population (31 February 2025)
  - Total: 1,969
  - Density: 61.30/km^{2} (158.8/sq mi)
- Demonym: Monterubbianesi
- Time zone: UTC+1 (CET)
  - Summer (DST): UTC+2 (CEST)
- Postal code: 63825
- Dialing code: 0734
- ISTAT code: 109022
- Patron saint: San Nicola da Tolentino
- Saint day: 10 September
- Website: Official website

Monterubbiano is a town and comune in the Province of Fermo, in the Marche region of Italy. It is on a hill 8 kilometres (5 mi) from the Adriatic Sea.

== History ==
In pre-historic times the area was inhabited by the Piceni (9th-3rd centuries BC). After the Roman conquest, it received the status of urbs urbana (built city) in 268 BC. In the 5th century it was captured by the Visigoths.

In the 12th century, it was a free commune, thwarting the attempts from Fermo to capture it. In the 15th century it was acquired by Francesco Sforza, who fortified it; in 1663 it became part of the Papal States, to which (apart from the Napoleonic period) it remained until 1860, when it was annexed to the newly formed Kingdom of Italy.

== Main sights ==
- Mura Castellane (walls), built by Francesco Sforza in 1443
- Porta del Pero and Porta San Basso, the ancient entrance gates
- Ghetto degli Ebrei, quarter of the Jew population in the 16th century
- Communal Palace (14th century), in Romanesque-Gothic style
- Pinacoteca (art gallery)
- Archaeological Museum, in the church of St. Francis (12th century)
- Inside one of the most important churches of the whole town, St. Maria dei Letterati which is situated next to the central square, are located various paintings and frameworks planned and carried out by the native-born painter Vincenzo Pagani.

== Notable people ==
- Vincenzo Pagani: an important renaissance painter.
- Temistocle Calzecchi Onesti: Italian physicist and inventor.
- Attilio Basili: also known as "Lu mattu de' susè", a vernacular poet recently died.
- Domenico Mircoli: an important medical researcher who found out in his studies concerning with intestinal disease, the so-called fibrogranulosi intestinale.

== Twin towns ==
- Winster, United Kingdom, since 1987
