= Iron filings =

Fine iron powder

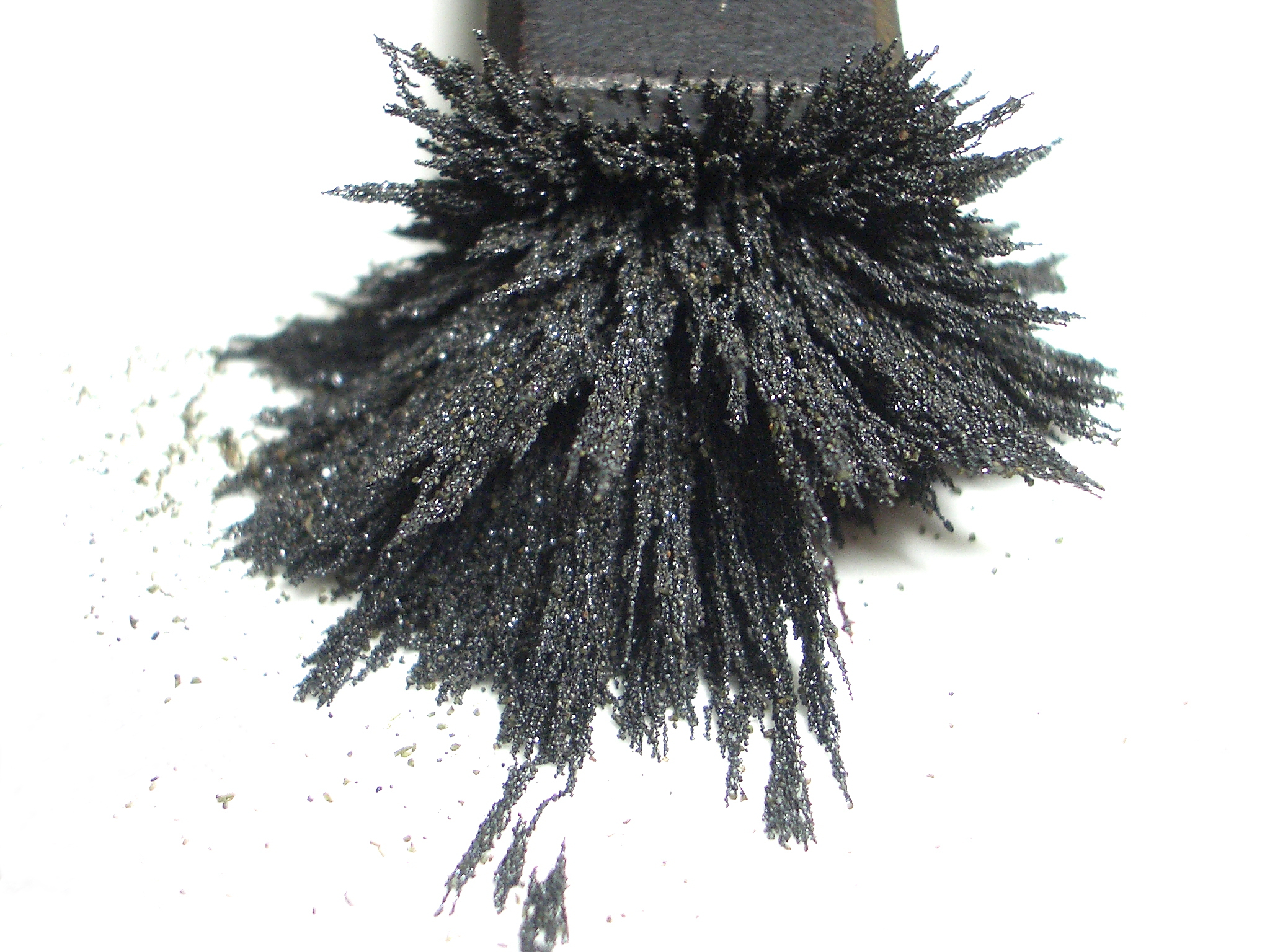
Iron filings on a magnet

Iron filings are very small pieces of iron that look like a powder with a dark-grey appearance. As the name suggests, iron filings can be obtained from metal working operations as the scrap material filed off larger iron and steel parts. They are very often used in science demonstrations to show the direction of a magnetic field. Since iron is a ferromagnetic material, a magnetic field induces each particle to become a tiny bar magnet. The south pole of each particle then attracts the north poles of its neighbors, and this process is repeated over a wide area to create chains of filings parallel to the direction of the magnetic field. Iron filings are used in many places, including schools, where they test the reaction of the filings to magnets. They are also used in some toys, most famously Wooly Willy, where they serve to mimic hair on a cartoon face.

== See also ==
- Iron sand
- Coherer (Iron filings tube)
