= Types of radio emissions =

Classification of radio frequency signals

The International Telecommunication Union uses an internationally agreed system for classifying radio frequency signals. Each type of radio emission is classified according to its bandwidth, method of modulation, nature of the modulating signal, and type of information transmitted on the carrier signal. It is based on characteristics of the signal, not on the transmitter used.

An emission designation is of the form BBBB 123 45, where BBBB is the bandwidth of the signal, 1 is a letter indicating the type of modulation used of the main carrier (not including any subcarriers which is why FM stereo is F8E and not D8E), 2 is a digit representing the type of modulating signal again of the main carrier, 3 is a letter corresponding to the type of information transmitted, 4 is a letter indicating the practical details of the transmitted information, and 5 is a letter that represents the method of multiplexing. The 4 and 5 fields are optional.

This designation system was agreed at the 1979 World Administrative Radio Conference (WARC 79), and gave rise to the Radio Regulations that came into force on 1 January 1982. A similar designation system had been in use under prior Radio Regulations.

== Designation details ==
=== Bandwidth ===
The bandwidth (BBBB above) is expressed as four characters: three digits and one letter. The letter occupies the position normally used for a decimal point, and indicates what unit of frequency is used to express the bandwidth. The letter H indicates Hertz, K indicates kiloHertz, M indicates megaHertz, and G indicates gigaHertz. For instance, "500H" means 500 Hz, and "2M50" means 2.5 MHz. The first character must be a digit between 1 and 9 or the letter H; it may not be the digit 0 or any other letter.

=== Type of modulation ===
Character	Description
A	Double-sideband amplitude modulation (e.g. AM broadcast radio)
B	Independent sideband (two sidebands containing different signals)
C	Vestigial sideband (e.g. NTSC)
D	Combination of AM and FM or PM
F	Frequency modulation (e.g. FM broadcast radio)
G	Phase modulation
H	Single-sideband modulation with full carrier (e.g. as used by CHU)
J	Single-sideband with suppressed carrier (e.g. Shortwave utility and amateur stations)
K	Pulse-amplitude modulation
L	Pulse-width modulation (e.g. as used by WWVB)
M	Pulse-position modulation
N	Unmodulated carrier (steady, single-frequency signal)
P	Sequence of pulses without modulation
Q	Sequence of pulses, with phase or frequency modulation in each pulse
R	Single-sideband with reduced or variable carrier
V	Combination of pulse modulation methods
W	Combination of any of the above
X	None of the above

=== Type of modulating signal ===
Character	Description
0	No modulating signal
1	One channel containing digital information, no subcarrier
2	One channel containing digital information, using a subcarrier
3	One channel containing analog information
7	More than one channel containing digital information
8	More than one channel containing analog information
9	Combination of analog and digital channels
X	None of the above

Types 4 and 5 were removed from use with the 1982 Radio Regulations. In previous editions, they had indicated facsimile and video, respectively.

=== Type of transmitted information ===
Character	Description
A	Aural telegraphy, intended to be decoded by ear, such as Morse code
B	Electronic telegraphy, intended to be decoded by machine (radioteletype and digital modes)
C	Facsimile (still images)
D	Data transmission, telemetry or telecommand (remote control)
E	Telephony (voice or music intended to be listened to by a human)
F	Video (television signals)
N	No transmitted information (other than existence of the signal)
W	Combination of any of the above
X	None of the above

=== Details of information ===
Character	Description
A	Two-condition code, elements vary in quantity and duration
B	Two-condition code, elements fixed in quantity and duration
C	Two-condition code, elements fixed in quantity and duration, error-correction included
D	Four-condition code, one condition per "signal element"
E	Multi-condition code, one condition per "signal element"
F	Multi-condition code, one character represented by one or more conditions
G	Monophonic broadcast-quality sound
H	Stereophonic or quadraphonic broadcast-quality sound
J	Commercial-quality sound (non-broadcast)
K	Commercial-quality sound—frequency inversion and-or "band-splitting" employed
L	Commercial-quality sound, independent FM signals, such as pilot tones, used to control the demodulated signal
M	Greyscale images or video
N	Full-color images or video
W	Combination of two or more of the above
X	None of the above

=== Multiplexing ===
Character	Description
C	Code-division (excluding spread spectrum)
F	Frequency-division
N	None used / not multiplexed
T	Time-division
W	Combination of Frequency-division and Time-division
X	None of the above

== Common examples ==
There is some overlap in signal types, so a transmission might legitimately be described by two or more designators. In such cases, there is usually a preferred conventional designator.

=== Broadcasting ===
A3E or A3E G
Ordinary amplitude modulation used for low frequency and medium frequency AM broadcasting

A8E, A8E H
AM stereo broadcasting.

F8E, F8E H
FM broadcasting for radio transmissions on VHF, and as the audio component of analogue television transmissions. Since there are generally pilot tones (subcarriers) for stereo and RDS the designator '8' is used, to indicate multiple signals.

C3F, C3F N
Analogue PAL, SÉCAM, or NTSC television video signals (formerly type A5C, until 1982)

C7W
ATSC digital television, commonly on VHF or UHF

G7W
DVB-T, ISDB-T, or DTMB digital television, commonly on VHF or UHF

=== Two-way radio ===
A3E
AM speech communication – used for aeronautical & amateur communications

F3E
FM speech communication – often used for marine radio and many other VHF communications

20K0 F3E
Wide FM, 20.0 kHz width, ±5 kHz deviation, still widely used for amateur radio, NOAA weather radio, marine, and aviation users and land mobile users below 50 MHz

11K2 F3E
Narrow FM, 11.25 kHz bandwidth, ±2.5 kHz deviation – In the United States, all Part 90 Land Mobile Radio Service (LMRS) users operating above 50 MHz were required to upgrade to narrowband equipment by 1 January 2013.

6K00 F3E
Even narrower FM, future roadmap for Land Mobile Radio Service (LMRS), already required on 700 MHz public safety band

J3E
SSB speech communication, used on HF bands by marine, aeronautical and amateur users

R3E
SSB with reduced carrier (AME) speech communication, primarily used on HF bands by the military (a.k.a. compatible sideband)

=== Low-speed data ===
N0N
Continuous, unmodulated carrier, formerly common for radio direction finding (RDF) in marine and aeronautical navigation.

A1A
Signalling by keying the carrier directly, a.k.a. continuous wave (CW) or on–off keying, currently used in amateur radio. This is often but not necessarily Morse code.

A2A
Signalling by transmitting a modulated tone with a carrier, so that it can easily be heard using an ordinary AM receiver. It was formerly widely used for station identification of non-directional beacons, usually but not exclusively Morse code (an example of a modulated continuous wave, as opposed to A1A, above).

F1B
Frequency-shift keying (FSK) telegraphy, such as RTTY. (Note: The designators F1B and F1D should be used for FSK radiotelegraphy and data transmissions, no matter how the radio frequency signal is generated (common examples are Audio FSK used to modulate an SSB transmitter or direct FSK modulation of an FM transmitter via varactor diode). However, occasionally the alternatives J2B and J2D are used to designate FSK signals generated by audio modulation of an SSB transmitter.)

F1C
High frequency Radiofax

F2D
Data transmission by frequency modulation of a radio frequency carrier with an audio frequency FSK subcarrier. Often called AFSK/FM.

J2B
Phase-shift keying such as PSK31 (BPSK31)

=== Other ===
P0N
Unmodulated Pulse-Doppler radar
