= AN/PRC-160 =

US military wideband HF/VHF tactical radio

AN/PRC-160
Type	Manpack tactical radio
Service History
Used by	US Army, US Marines, US Air Force, German Army, Netherlands Armed Forces
Conflicts	Iraq War, War in Afghanistan, Operation Inherent Resolve
Production history
Manufacturer	L3Harris
Produced	2017–present
Specifications
Frequency range	1.6-60 MHz
Transmit power	up to 20 watts
Modes	FM (VHF), AM, AME, SSB, CW
Encryption	NSA Type 1 algorithms (Top Secret and below)
Weight	9.1 lbs (w/o battery)

The AN/PRC-160 Wideband HF/VHF Manpack Radio is a tactical HF/VHF manpack radio manufactured by L3Harris. The PRC-160 is the manpack HF radio for the Harris Falcon III family of radios. It replaces the earlier AN/PRC-150, with a smaller form factor and lighter weight than its predecessor, and being capable of 4th Generation Automatic Link Establishment (4G ALE), achieving data transmission speeds up to 10 times faster.

In accordance with the Joint Electronics Type Designation System (JETDS), the "AN/PRC-160" designation represents the 160th design of an Army-Navy electronic device for portable two-way communications radio. The JETDS system also now is used to name all Department of Defense electronic systems.

== Service history ==
The AN/PRC-160 began production in 2017 as the HF manpack component to the Harris Falcon III ecosystem of tactical radios. Several DoD contracts have since been signed by branches of the US military, including a nearly $8 million US Air Force contract for 264 radios. The PRC-160 is part of the Integrated Tactical Network, the US Army's successor to the failed Joint Tactical Radio System (JTRS) program. The PRC-160 is also in service with the special operations forces of multiple European nations, including Germany, Poland, France, and Ukraine.

The PRC-160 offers improved data transmissions speeds compared to previous generation HF manpack radios, thanks to the use of 4G ALE. This improvement in data speed, combined with the fact that HF radios (unlike SATCOM radios) do not require external infrastructure to achieve Beyond-Line-of-Sight (BLOS) communications with stations several hundred miles away, has led to many nations armed forces investing in new HF radios for redundancy against the vulnerabilities of SATCOM radio communication systems.

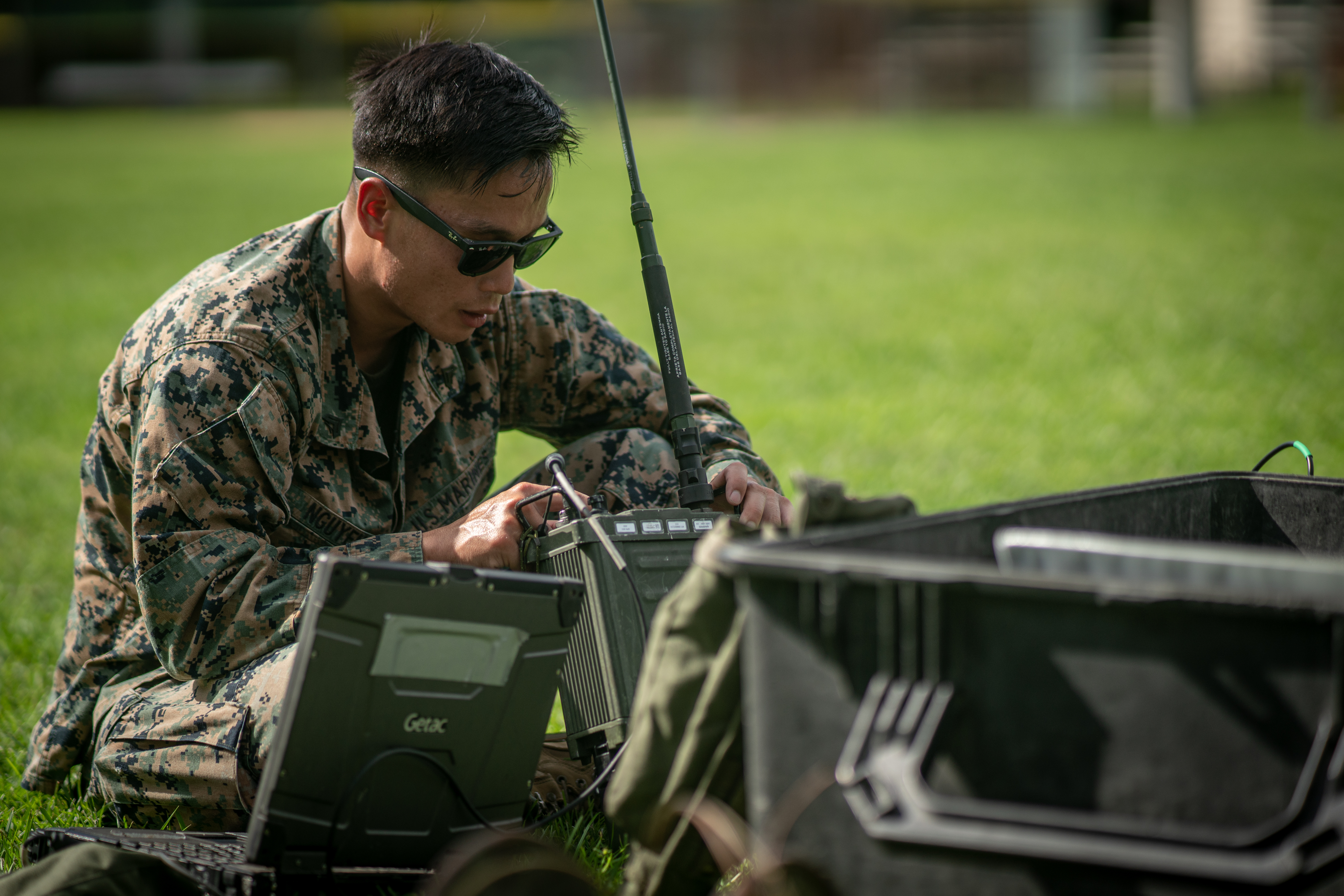
A US Marine radio operator using a PRC-160 during a High Frequency (HF) radio communication competition.

== Specifications ==
- Frequency Range: 1.5-60 MHz
- Presets: 99, fully programmable
- Transmit Power: HF- 1 to 20 watts PEP, VHF- 1 to 10 watts FM
- Waveforms: AM, AME, USB, LSB, CW, FM
- Antenna connector: BNC female with threaded collar, 50 Ω characteristic impedance, unbalanced
- Antenna Tuning Capability: OE-505 10-foot (3 m) whip, RF-1941 dipole, random wires, long wires
- Data Interface: USB and Ethernet with adapter
- GPS: Internal antenna, with external antenna connector. Commercial and SAASM-compatible external antennas available for both.
- Management Tool: Windows-based Communications Planning Application (CPA), WebUI for network monitoring and management
- Encryption: NSA Type 1 (Top Secret and below), AES, Citadel (NSA-approved exportable COMSEC)

== See also ==
- List of military electronics of the United States
