= Controlled-envelope single-sideband modulation =

Type of sideband modulation

CESSB (controlled-envelope single-sideband) is a narrowband modulation method using a single sideband, whose peak envelope level is controlled so that the peak-to-average power ratio of CESSB is much reduced compared to standard SSB modulation and offers improved effective range over standard SSB modulation while simultaneously retaining backwards compatibility with standard SSB radios.

A drawback of standard SSB modulation is the generation of large envelope overshoots well above the average envelope level for a sinusoidal tone (even when the audio signal is peak-limited). In combination with RF amplifiers with non-linear properties this causes severe distortions of the transmitted audio signal. Therefore, the average RF power level must be reduced in order to accommodate the overshoots.

The standard SSB envelope peaks are due to truncation of the spectrum and nonlinear phase distortion from the approximation errors of the practical implementation of the required Hilbert transform. It was recently shown that suitable overshoot compensation (so-called controlled-envelope SSB, or CESSB) achieves about 3.8 dB of peak reduction for speech transmission. This results in an effective average power increase of about 140%. Although the generation of the CESSB signal can be integrated into the SSB modulator, it is feasible to separate the generation of the CESSB signal (e.g. in form of an external speech preprocessor) from a conventional SSB radio. This requires that the SSB radio's modulator be linear-phase and have a sufficient bandwidth to pass the CESSB signal. If an otherwise conventional SSB modulator meets these requirements, then the envelope control by the CESSB process is preserved.

CESSB is being used experimentally by amateur radio operators and is implemented by some radios in the amateur marketplace. SmartSDR software by Flex Radio Systems implements CESSB, as do certain software-defined radios, such as the Apache labs ANAN series, the QRP Labs QMX/QMX+ and the Elecraft K4.

== See also ==
- ACSSB, amplitude-companded single sideband
- Independent sideband
- Modulation for other examples of modulation techniques
- Sideband for more general information about a sideband
