= 1.25-meter band =

Amateur radio frequency band

The 1.25-meter, 220 MHz or 222 MHz band is a portion of the VHF radio spectrum internationally allocated for amateur radio use on a primary basis in ITU Region 2, and it comprises frequencies from 220 MHz to 225 MHz. In the United States and Canada, the band is available on a primary basis from 222 to 225 MHz, with the addition of 219 to 220 MHz on a limited, secondary basis. It is not available for use in ITU Region 1 (except in Somalia) or ITU Region 3. The license privileges of amateur radio operators include the use of frequencies within this band, which is primarily used for local communications. In the U.S. and Canada, the 1.25-meter band calling frequencies are 223.500 MHz for FM simplex and 222.100 MHz for SSB/CW.

== History ==
The 1.25-meter band has a very long and colorful history, dating back to before World War II.

=== Pre-Cairo Conference ===
Some experimental amateur use in the U.S. was known to occur on the "1 1/4-meter band" as early as 1933, with reliable communications achieved in fall of 1934.

=== The Cairo Conference ===
In 1938, the FCC gave U.S. amateurs privileges in two VHF bands: 2.5 meters (112 MHz) and 1.25 meters (224 MHz). Both bands (as well as 70 centimeters) were natural harmonics of the 5-meter band. Amateur privileges in the 2.5-meter band were later moved to 144–148 MHz (becoming the modern-day 2-meter band), and the old frequencies were reassigned to aircraft communication during World War II. At that time, the 1.25-meter band expanded to a 5 MHz bandwidth, spanning 220–225 MHz.

=== The VHF/UHF explosion ===
Amateur use of VHF and UHF allocations exploded in the late 1960s and early 1970s as repeaters started going on the air. Repeater use sparked a huge interest in the 2-meter and 70-centimeter (420–450 MHz) bands; however, this interest never fully found its way into the 1.25-meter band. Many amateurs attribute this to the abundance of commercial radio equipment designed for 136–174 MHz and 450–512 MHz that amateurs could easily modify for use on the 2-meter and 70-centimeter bands. There were no commercial frequency allocations near the 1.25-meter band, and little commercial radio equipment was available. This meant that amateurs who wanted to experiment with the 1.25-meter band had to build their own equipment or purchase one of the few radios available from specialized amateur radio equipment manufacturers. Many of the repeaters which have been constructed for 1.25-meter operation have been based on converted land-mobile base station hardware, often extensively modifying equipment originally designed for other VHF bands.

=== U.S. Novice licensees get privileges ===
By the 1980s, amateur use of 2-meter and 70-centimeter bands was at an all-time high while activity on 1.25 meters remained stagnant. In an attempt to increase use on the band, many amateurs called for holders of Novice-class licenses (the entry-level class at that time) to be given voice privileges on the band. In 1987, the FCC modified the Novice license to allow voice privileges on portions of the 1.25-meter and 23-centimeter (1.24–1.30 GHz) bands. In response, some of the bigger amateur radio equipment manufacturers started producing equipment for 1.25 meters. However, it never sold well, and by the early 1990s, most manufacturers had stopped producing equipment for the band.

=== U.S. reallocation ===
In 1973, the FCC considered Docket Number 19759, which was a proposal to establish a Class E Citizen's band service at 224 MHz. The proposal was opposed by the ARRL and after the explosive growth of 27 MHz Citizen's Band usage, the FCC dropped consideration of the docket in 1977.

In the late 1980s, United Parcel Service (UPS) began lobbying the FCC to reallocate part of the 1.25-meter band to the Land Mobile Service. UPS had publicized plans to use the band to develop a narrow-bandwidth wireless voice and data network using a mode called ACSSB (amplitude-companded single sideband). UPS's main argument for the reallocation was that amateur use of the band was very sparse and that the public interest would be better served by reallocating part of the band to a service that would put it to good use.

In 1988, over the objections of the amateur radio community, the FCC adopted the 220 MHz Allocation Order, which reallocated 220–222 MHz to private and federal government land-mobile use while leaving 222–225 MHz exclusively for amateur use. The reallocation proceeding took so long, however, that UPS eventually pursued other means of meeting its communications needs. UPS entered into agreements with GTE, McCall, Southwestern Bell, and Pac-Tel to use cellular telephone frequencies to build a wireless data network. With the 220–222 MHz band then left unused, the FCC issued parts of the band to other private commercial interests via a lottery in hopes that it would spark development of super-narrowband technologies, which would help them gain acceptance in the marketplace. In the 1990s and into the 2000s paging companies made use of the 1.25-meter band. Most all such use ended by the mid-2000s, with the paging companies being purchased by others and services moved to newer systems, or having gone out of business.

=== Canadian reallocation ===
Until January 2006, Canadian amateur radio operators were allowed to operate within the entire 220–225 MHz band. Canadian operations within 120 km of the United States border were required to observe a number of restrictions on antenna height and power levels to coordinate use with non-amateur services in the United States.

In 2005, Industry Canada decided to reallocate 220–222 MHz to land mobile users, similar to the US, but unlike in the US, a provision was included to allow the amateur service, in exceptional circumstances, to use the band in disaster relief efforts on a secondary basis. In addition, the band 219–220 MHz was allocated to the amateur service on a secondary basis. Both of these reallocations went into effect January 2006.

== Band use ==
=== Canadian band plan ===
Band plan
License class	219–220	220–222	222.00–222.05	222.05–222.10	222.10–222.275	222.275–222.3	222.31–223.37	223.39–223.49	223.49–223.59	223.59–223.89	223.91–225
Basic(+), Advanced											

Key for the band plan
= Available on a secondary basis to other users.
= Available only to assist with disaster relief efforts.
= Reserved for EME (Moon bounce)
= Continuous wave (CW), 222.1 calling freq.
= SSB, 222.2 calling freq.
= Propagation beacons
= FM repeaters (input −1.6 MHz)
= High-speed data
= FM simplex, 223.5 calling freq.

=== Scope of operation in North America ===
Today, the 1.25-meter band is used by many amateurs who have an interest in the VHF spectrum.

There are pockets of widespread use across the United States, mainly in New England and western states such as California and Arizona with more sporadic activity elsewhere. The number of repeaters on the 1.25-meter band has grown over the years to approximately 1,500 nationwide as of 2004.

The attention that band received in the late 1980s and early 1990s due to the reallocation of its bottom 2 MHz sparked renewed amateur interest. Many amateurs feared that lack of 1.25-meter activity would lead to reallocation of the remaining 3 MHz to other services. Today, new handheld and mobile equipment is being produced by amateur radio manufacturers, and it is estimated that more amateurs have 1.25-meter equipment now than at any point in the past.

=== Auxiliary stations ===
An auxiliary station, most often used for repeater control or link purposes or to remotely control another station, is limited in the United States to operation on frequencies above 144.5 MHz excluding 144.0–144.5 MHz, 145.8–146.0 MHz, 219–220 MHz, 222.00–222.15 MHz, 431–433 MHz, and 435–438 MHz. Operation of such control links in the crowded 2-meter band is problematic and on many frequencies in that band expressly prohibited, leaving 1.25-meter band frequencies as the lowest available for remote control of repeaters and unattended stations.

== List of transceivers ==
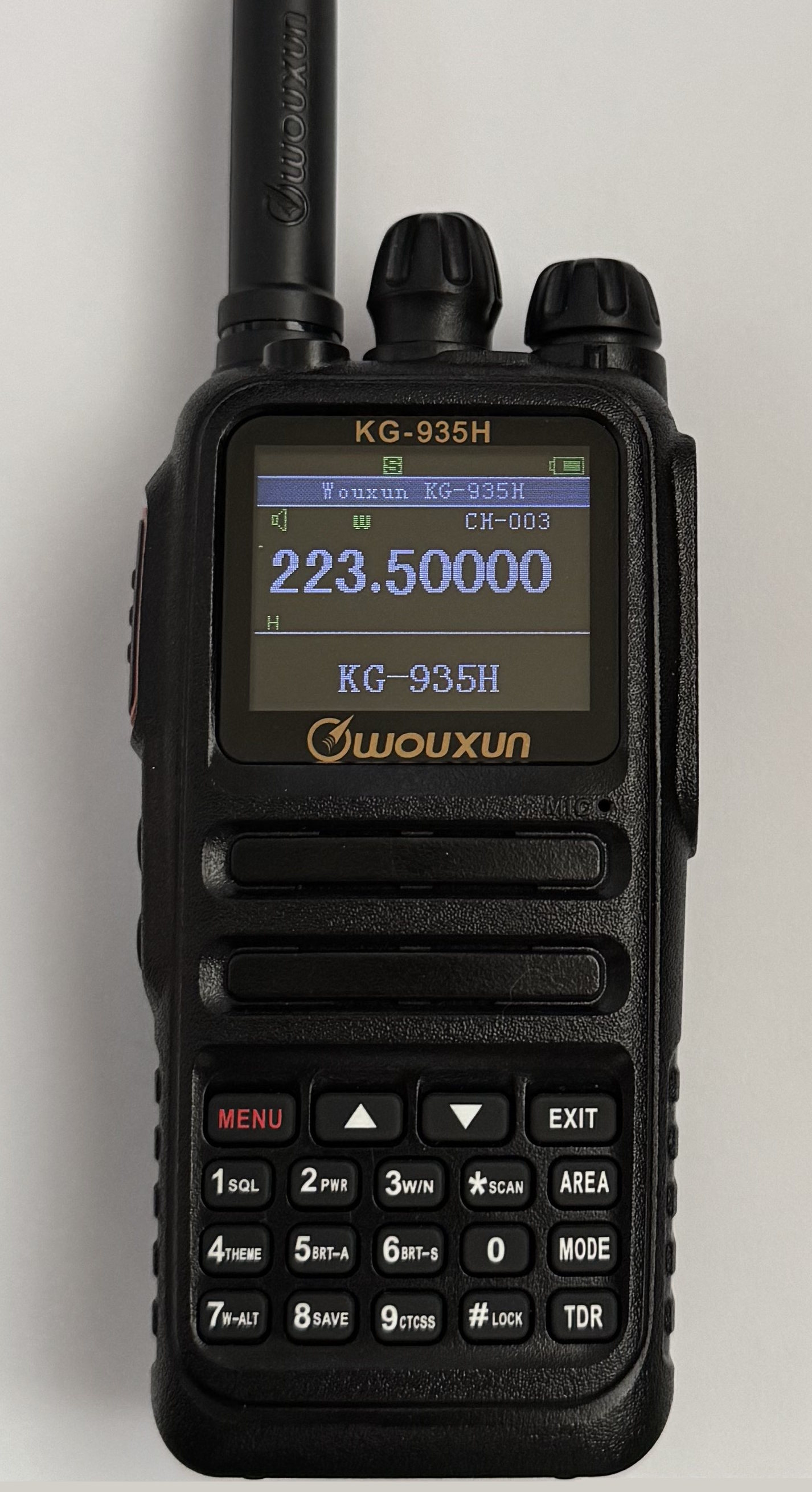
Wouxun KG-935H tri-band handheld transceiver

Since the band is allocated mostly in ITU Region 2 (Somalia, in Region 1, being the only exception thus far), the major equipment manufacturers (Kenwood, Yaesu, and Icom) do not often offer transceiver models that cover the frequency range. This exacerbates the lack of usage of the 1.25-meter band, though manufacturers argue that what equipment they have produced has not sold well compared to other products.

In the late 1970's Yaesu introduced the FT-127 single band 220 MHz base station and the FT-109RH portable radio. In 1987 they introduced the FT-33, single band 220 MHz version of the popular FT-23 portable radio.

In the 1980s, ICOM offered the IC-37A, a 220 MHz 25-watt FM transceiver.

Kenwood, Yaesu, Wouxun, and Baofeng include the 1.25-meter band in some of their multiband handheld transceivers.

Elecraft offers an all-mode (CW, FM, SSB) transverter for the band compatible with its K2 and K3 transceivers.

Handheld transceivers
Manufacturer	Model	Year released	Availability	Transmit bands	Stated max transmit power on 1.25m band
Yaesu	VX-7R	2002	Discontinued	4 - 1.25m, 2m, 6m, 70cm	0.3 watts
Kenwood	TH-F6A	2004	Discontinued	3 - 1.25m, 2m, 70cm	Unknown
Yaesu	VX-6R	2005	Available	3 - 1.25m, 2m, 70cm	4 watts
Yaesu	VX-8R	2008	Discontinued	4 - 1.25m, 2m, 6m, 70cm	Unknown
Wouxun	KG-UVD1P	2009	Discontinued	3 - 1.25m, 2m, 70cm	Unknown
Baofeng	UV-82X	2013	Discontinued	2 - 1.25m, 2m	Unknown
BTech	UV-5X3	2016	Available	3 - 1.25m, 2m, 70cm	4 watts
Kenwood	TH-D74A	2016	Discontinued	3 - 1.25m, 2m, 70cm	5 watts
Wouxun	KG-UV7D	2019	Available	2 - 1.25m, 2m	5 watts
Baofeng	UV-5RIII	2021	Available	3 - 1.25m, 2m, 70cm	Unknown
Wouxun	KG-Q10H	2023	Available	4 - 1.25m, 2m, 6m, 70cm	1.5 watts
Baofeng	BF-F8HP PRO	2024	Available	3 - 1.25m, 2m, 70cm	5 watts
Kenwood	TH-D75A	2024	Available	3 - 1.25m, 2m, 70cm	5 watts
Wouxun	KG-935H	2025	Available	3 - 1.25m, 2m, 70cm	5 watts

Base/mobile transceivers
Manufacturer	Model	Year released	Availability	Transmit bands	Stated max transmit power on 1.25m band
Alinco	DR-235T	2000	Discontinued	1 - 1.25m	Unknown
Jetstream	JT220M	2009	Discontinued	1 - 1.25m	Unknown
TYT	TH-9000 220-260MHz	2011	Discontinued	1 - 1.25m	55 watts
Anytone	AT-5888UV-III	2013	Available	3 - 1.25m, 2m, 70cm	25 watts
BTech	UV-2501-220	2016	Discontinued	1 - 1.25m	Unknown
Wouxun	KG-B55 Tri band	2016	Discontinued	3 - 1.25m, 2m, 70cm	Unknown
BTech	UV-25X4	2017	Available	3 - 1.25m, 2m, 70cm	20 watts
BTech	UV-50X3	2019	Available	3 - 1.25m, 2m, 70cm	5 watts
TYT	TH-9000D Plus 1.25M	2021	Available	1 - 1.25m	45 watts
Anytone	AT-D578UVIII-Plus	2022	Available	3 - 1.25m, 2m, 70cm	5 watts
Wouxun	KG-XS20H	2025	Available	3 - 1.25m, 2m, 70cm	10 watts
Kenwood	TM-D750A	2026	Backordered	3 - 1.25m, 2m, 70cm	20 watts

== Countries with known allocations ==
ITU Region 1

- Somalia (220–225 MHz)

ITU Region 2

- Anguilla (220–225 MHz)
- Argentina (220–225 MHz)
- Aruba (220–225 MHz)
- Barbados (222–225 MHz)
- Belize (220–225 MHz)
- Bermuda (220–225 MHz)
- Bolivia (220–225 MHz)
- Bonaire (220–225 MHz)
- Brazil (220–225 MHz)
- British Virgin Islands (220–225 MHz)
- Canada (222–225 MHz amateur primary exclusive; 219–220 MHz secondary and shared; 220–222 MHz, only for "disaster relief" )
- Cayman Islands (220–225 MHz)
- Chile (220–225 MHz)
- Costa Rica (222–225 MHz)
- Colombia (220–225 MHz)
- Cuba (222.9–224.6 MHz)
- Curaçao (220–225 MHz)
- Dominica (222.340–224.000 MHz)
- Dominican Republic (220–225 MHz)
- Ecuador (220–225 MHz)
- El Salvador (220–225 MHz)
- French Overseas Departments and Territories in Region 2 (220–225 MHz)
  - Overseas Departments:
    - French Guiana
    - Guadeloupe
    - Martinique
  - Overseas collectivities:
    - Saint Barthélemy
    - Saint Martin
    - Saint Pierre and Miquelon
- Guyana (220–225 MHz)
- Haiti (220–225 MHz)
- Honduras (222–225 MHz)
- Jamaica (220–225 MHz)
- Mexico (222–225 MHz) (Band is channelized in some segments, and shared with commercial and government operations, including police.)
- Montserrat (220–225 MHz)
- Nicaragua (220–225 MHz)
- Panama (220–225 MHz)
- Paraguay (220–225 MHz)
- Peru (220–225 MHz)
- Sint Maarten (220–225 MHz)
- Suriname (220–225 MHz)
- Trinidad and Tobago (220–225 MHz)
- Turks and Caicos Islands (222–225 MHz)
- United States of America (222–225 MHz amateur primary exclusive; 219–220 MHz secondary, shared and limited)
- Uruguay (220–225 MHz)
- Venezuela (220–225 MHz)

Range	Band	ITU Region 1	ITU Region 2	ITU Region 3
LF	2200 m	135.7–137.8 kHz		
MF	630 m	472–479 kHz		
MF	160 m	1.810–1.850 MHz	1.800–2.000 MHz	
HF	80 / 75 m	3.500–3.800 MHz	3.500–4.000 MHz	3.500–3.900 MHz
HF	60 m	5.3515–5.3665 MHz		
HF	40 m	7.000–7.200 MHz	7.000–7.300 MHz	7.000–7.200 MHz
HF	30 m^{[t2]}	10.100–10.150 MHz		
HF	20 m	14.000–14.350 MHz		
HF	17 m^{[t2]}	18.068–18.168 MHz		
HF	15 m	21.000–21.450 MHz		
HF	12 m^{[t2]}	24.890–24.990 MHz		
HF	10 m	28.000–29.700 MHz		
VHF	8 m^{[t3]}	40.000–40.700 MHz	—N/a	
VHF	6 m	50.000–52.000 MHz (50.000–54.000 MHz)^{[t4]}	50.000–54.000 MHz	
VHF	5 m^{[t3]}	58.000–60.100 MHz	—N/a	
VHF	4 m^{[t3]}	70.000–70.500 MHz	—N/a	
VHF	2 m	144.000–146.000 MHz	144.000–148.000 MHz	
VHF	1.25 m	—N/a	220.000–225.000 MHz	—N/a
UHF	70 cm	430.000–440.000 MHz	430.000–440.000 MHz (420.000–450.000 MHz)^{[t4]}	
UHF	33 cm	—N/a	902.000–928.000 MHz	—N/a
UHF	23 cm	1.240–1.300 GHz		
UHF	13 cm	2.300–2.450 GHz		
SHF	9 cm	3.400–3.475 GHz^{[t4]}	3.300–3.500 GHz	
SHF	5 cm	5.650–5.850 GHz	5.650–5.925 GHz	5.650–5.850 GHz
SHF	3 cm	10.000–10.500 GHz		
SHF	1.2 cm	24.000–24.250 GHz		
EHF	6 mm	47.000–47.200 GHz		
EHF	4 mm^{[t4]}	75.500 GHz^{[t3]} – 81.500 GHz	76.000–81.500 GHz	
EHF	2.5 mm	122.250–123.000 GHz		
EHF	2 mm	134.000–141.000 GHz		
EHF	1 mm	241.000–250.000 GHz		
THF	Sub-mm	Some administrations have authorized spectrum for amateur use in this region; others have declined to regulate frequencies above 300 GHz.		
[t1]	All allocations are subject to variation by country. For simplicity, only common allocations found internationally are listed. See a band's article for specifics.			
[t2]	HF allocation created at the 1979 World Administrative Radio Conference. These are commonly called the "WARC bands".			
[t3]	This is not mentioned in the ITU's Table of Frequency Allocations, but many individual administrations have commonly adopted this allocation under "Article 4.4".			
[t4]	This includes a currently active footnote allocation mentioned in the ITU's Table of Frequency Allocations. These allocations may only apply to a group of countries.			
See also: Radio spectrum, Electromagnetic spectrum
