= Reduced-carrier transmission =

AM signal with a low-power or suppressed carrier

Reduced-carrier transmission is an amplitude modulation (AM) transmission in which the carrier signal level is reduced to reduce wasted electrical power. Suppressed-carrier transmission is a special case in which the carrier level is reduced below that required for demodulation by a normal receiver.

Reduction of the carrier level permits higher power levels in the sidebands than would be possible with conventional AM transmission. Carrier power must be restored by the receiving station to permit demodulation, usually by means of a beat frequency oscillator (BFO). Failure of the BFO to match the original carrier frequency when receiving such a signal will cause a heterodyne.

Suppressed carriers are often used for single sideband (SSB) transmissions, such as for amateur radio on shortwave. That system is referred to in full as SSB suppressed carrier (SSBSC) or (SSB-SC). International broadcasters agreed in 1985 to also use SSBSC entirely by 2015, although the anticipated widespread adoption of IBOC and IBAC digital radio (specifically Digital Radio Mondiale) would seem likely to make this irrelevant.

FM stereo transmissions use a double-sideband suppressed carrier (DSBSC) signal from a stereo generator, together with a pilot tone of exactly half the original carrier frequency. This allows reconstitution of the original stereo carrier, and hence the stereo signal.

== See also ==
- Carrier recovery
