= Transmitter Hamburg-Billstedt =

German broadcasting facility

Coordinates: 53°31′09″N 10°06′10″E

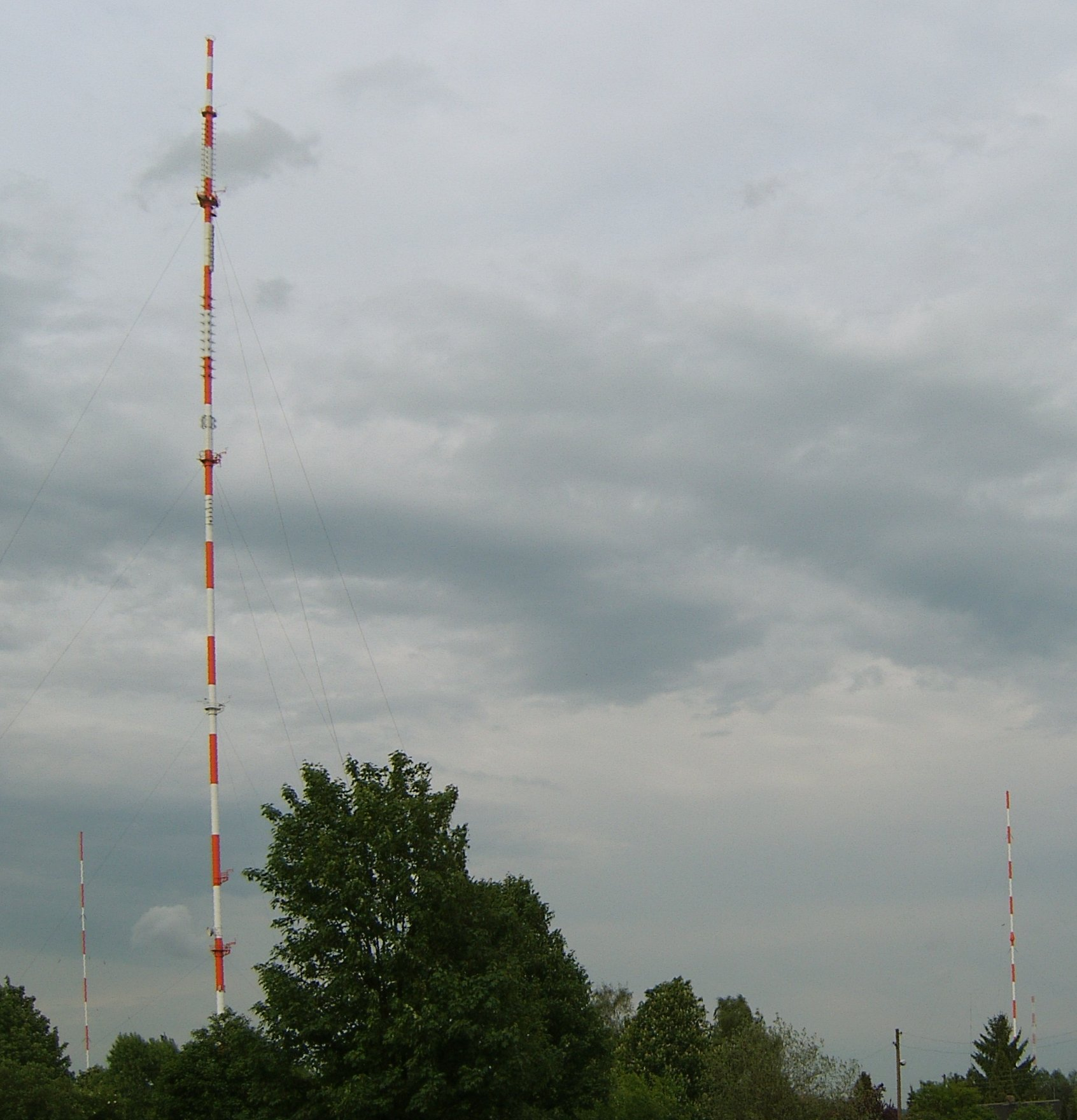
With its 304m it is the highest structure in Hamburg

The Transmitter Hamburg-Billstedt is a broadcasting facility in Hamburg-Billstedt, established in 1934. It is owned and operated by the Norddeutscher Rundfunk public broadcasting service, but open to competitors, too.

== History ==
From 1934 to 1949 it used as transmission aerial a wire hung up in a tower of wood. This tower had until 1941 a height of 145 metres. In 1941 its height was reduced to 84.5 metres and in 1949 it was demolished.

In 1940 a second aerial in form of a triangle area aerial was built. This aerial allowing transmitting on a wide frequency range was demolished in the Fifties. In 1949/50 a 198-metre-high guyed steelframework mast with a cage aerial and a transmission aerial for FM and TV on its top was erected. From this mast, which was partly destroyed by a storm during its erection in December 1949, between 1953 and 1962 the programme of the "Deutschen Langwellensender" (German longwave transmitter) was broadcast. This programme was transmitted in a special modulation mode, the compatible single sideband modulation, allowing smaller bandwidth and the possibility of reception with conventional AM receivers. Because this mast was under high voltage the aerials for FM and TV on its top were fed via a Goubau line.

In the first half of the 1960s this aerial mast was demounted and the current installation built. It consists of:

- Guyed steel tube mast for FM and TV, built in 1960. This radio mast has a diameter of 2 metres. It was 255 metres high in 1960 and grew to 300 metres in the meantime.
- Guyed tubular mast radiator for mediumwave. This mast, which is 184 metres tall, is insulated against ground. It is designed as double feedable fading-reducing aerial and therefore equipped with a separation insulator in a height of 101 metres
- Guyed steel tube mast with a height of 120.9 metres and a diameter of 0.7 metres. This mast was built in 1939. It stood until 1963 at Osterloog transmitting station and was dismounted in this year and rebuilt in Hamburg-Billstedt. It is insulated against ground and used as back-up aerial for mediumwave.
- Guyed steel framework mast with a height of 77 metres insulated against ground. This mast built in 1979 is used as reflector mast for the 184-metre-high medium wave transmission mast. Its construction was necessary because of the conditions of the waveplan of Geneva.

Since 1967, the University of Hamburg has been using the 304 m-mast as a six-level meteorological measurement platform, with thermometers, hygrometers, and anemometers mounted at various heights up to 280 m above ground. The atmospheric variables are sampled at a high temporal resolution to allow computation of boundary layer turbulent fluxes of heat and momentum. Live data and time series are also made available via the World Wide Web.

In 2025, a second Mast of 303 m high was made for NDR nearby.

== Hamburg's Light Miracle ==
In 1934, shortly after the inauguration of the facility, some owners of recreational gardens discovered that a light bulb connected to ground and a highly spun wire made the bulb light up brightly enough to illuminate a small house. Later many other did so. Transmission energy is taken from the transmitter, and induces electrical power in the wire. This effect was not discovered immediately. Later, technicians of the transmitter noticed, that in the houses of nearby gardens, lights went on and off depending on whether the transmitter was switched on or off. This phenomenon got the nickname "Hamburger Lichtwunder" (German: "Hamburg's light miracle"). After this was discovered, use of transmitting energy of radio transmitters for other purposes than radio reception was prohibited in Germany by law.

technic3d.com, Literature "Wunder der Wellen", Author: Eduard Rhein

== See also ==
- List of masts
- List of towers
