= Laplace–Carson transform =

Variant of the Laplace integral transform

In mathematics, the Laplace–Carson transform, named for Pierre Simon Laplace and John Renshaw Carson, is an integral transform closely related to the standard Laplace transform. It is defined by multiplying the Laplace transform of a function by the complex variable $p$. This modification can simplify the analysis of certain functions, particularly the unit step function and Dirac delta function, whose transforms become simple constants. The transform has applications in physics and engineering, especially in the study of vibrations and transient phenomena in electrical circuits and mechanical structures.

== Relationship to the Laplace transform ==
The Laplace–Carson transform $V^\ast(j,p)$ is directly defined from the one-sided Laplace transform $F(s)$. If $F(s) = \mathcal{L}\{V(j,t)\}(s)$ is the Laplace transform of $V(j,t)$, then the Laplace–Carson transform is given by:

$$V^\ast(j,p) = p \mathcal{L}\{V(j,t)\}(p) = p \int^{\infty}_0 V(j,t) e^{-pt} \, dt$$

where the variable $p$ is used in place of the more common $s$ for the frequency domain. Due to the multiplication by $p$, the transform of a derivative, $\mathcal{L}\{V'(t)\} = pF(p) - V(0)$, takes a different form that some authors found more convenient for operational calculus.

== Definition ==
Let $V(j,t)$ be a function and $p$ a complex variable. The Laplace–Carson transform is defined as:

$$V^\ast(j,p) = p\int^{\infty}_0 V(j,t) e^{-pt} \, dt$$

The inverse Laplace–Carson transform is:

$$V(j,t) = \frac{1}{2\pi i} \int^{a_0+i\infty}_{a_0-i\infty} e^{tp} \frac{V^\ast(j,p)}{p} \, dp$$

where $a_0$ is a real-valued constant chosen so that the integration path lies to the right of all singularities of the integrand.

== See also ==
- Laplace transform
