= Amplitude-companded single-sideband modulation =

Type of sideband modulation

Amplitude-companded single-sideband (ACSB) is a narrowband modulation method using a single-sideband with a pilot tone, allowing an expander in the receiver to restore the amplitude that was severely compressed by the transmitter. The pilot tone serves as a frequency reference for the receiver, eliminating the signal distortion that would occur with single-sideband suppressed carrier modulation when the receiver is off frequency.

It offers improved effective range over standard SSB modulation while simultaneously retaining backwards compatibility with standard SSB radios. ACSB also offers reduced bandwidth and improved range for a given power level compared with narrow band FM modulation.

The companding used in ACSB is a type of dynamic range reduction wherein the difference in amplitude between the louder and softer sounds is reduced prior to transmission. A corresponding expander circuit in the receiver inverts this transformation in order to restore the dynamic range. If a conventional SSB receiver is used to receive ACSB signals, some distortion may be noticed but generally the signals are quite intelligible. Similar techniques are used in audio noise reduction circuits such as those developed for Dolby.

ACSB is being used by amateur radio operators, air-to-ground phones, as well as mobile-satellite services.
