= Carson bandwidth rule =

Rule in telecommunications

In telecommunications, the Carson's bandwidth rule defines the approximate bandwidth requirements of communications system components for a carrier signal that is frequency modulated by a continuous or broad spectrum of frequencies rather than a single frequency. Carson's rule does not apply well when the modulating signal contains discontinuities, such as a square wave. Carson's rule originates from John Renshaw Carson's 1922 paper.

Carson's bandwidth rule is expressed by the relation:
$$\mathrm{CBR} = 2 (\Delta f + f_m)$$
where:

- $\mathrm{CBR}$ is the bandwidth requirement;
- $\Delta f$ is the peak frequency deviation; and
- $f_\mathrm{m}$ is the highest frequency in the modulating signal.

For example, a typical VHF/UHF two-way radio signal using FM mode, with 5 kHz peak deviation, and a maximum audio frequency of 3 kHz, would require an approximate bandwidth of 2 × (5 kHz + 3 kHz) = 16 kHz.

Standard broadcast stereo FM, with a peak deviation of 75 kHz, has a highest modulating frequency (which combines L + R and L − R) of 53 kHz (assuming no RDS or other subcarriers). Most of the energy therefore falls within an approximate bandwidth of 2 × (75 + 53) = 256 kHz. (Geographically close FM broadcast transmitters are almost always assigned nominal center frequencies at least 400 kHz apart).

Carson's bandwidth rule is often applied to transmitters, antennas, optical sources, receivers, photodetectors, and other communications system components.

Any frequency modulated signal will have an infinite number of sidebands and hence an infinite bandwidth but, in practice, all significant sideband energy (98% or more) is concentrated within the bandwidth defined by Carson's rule. It is a useful approximation, but setting the arbitrary definition of occupied bandwidth at 98% of the power still means that the power outside the band is about $10\log\left(\frac{0.98}{0.02}\right) \approx$ $17\;\mathrm{dB}$ less than the carrier inside, therefore more information is needed for spectrum planning.
