= Pilot signal =

Communication system technology

In telecommunications, a pilot signal is a signal, usually a single frequency, transmitted over a communications system for supervisory, control, equalization, continuity, synchronization, or reference purposes.

== Uses in different communication systems ==
=== FM Radio ===
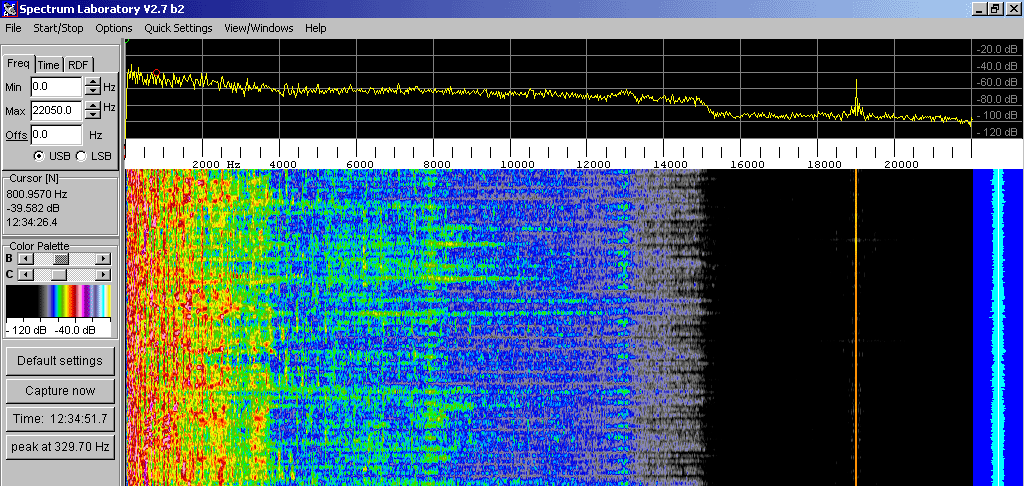
Spectrum of an FM broadcast signal. The pilot tone is the orange vertical line on the right of the spectrogram.

In FM stereo broadcasting, a pilot tone of 19 kHz indicates that there is stereophonic information at 38 kHz (the second harmonic of the pilot tone). The receiver doubles the frequency of the pilot tone and uses it as a frequency and phase reference to demodulate the stereo information.

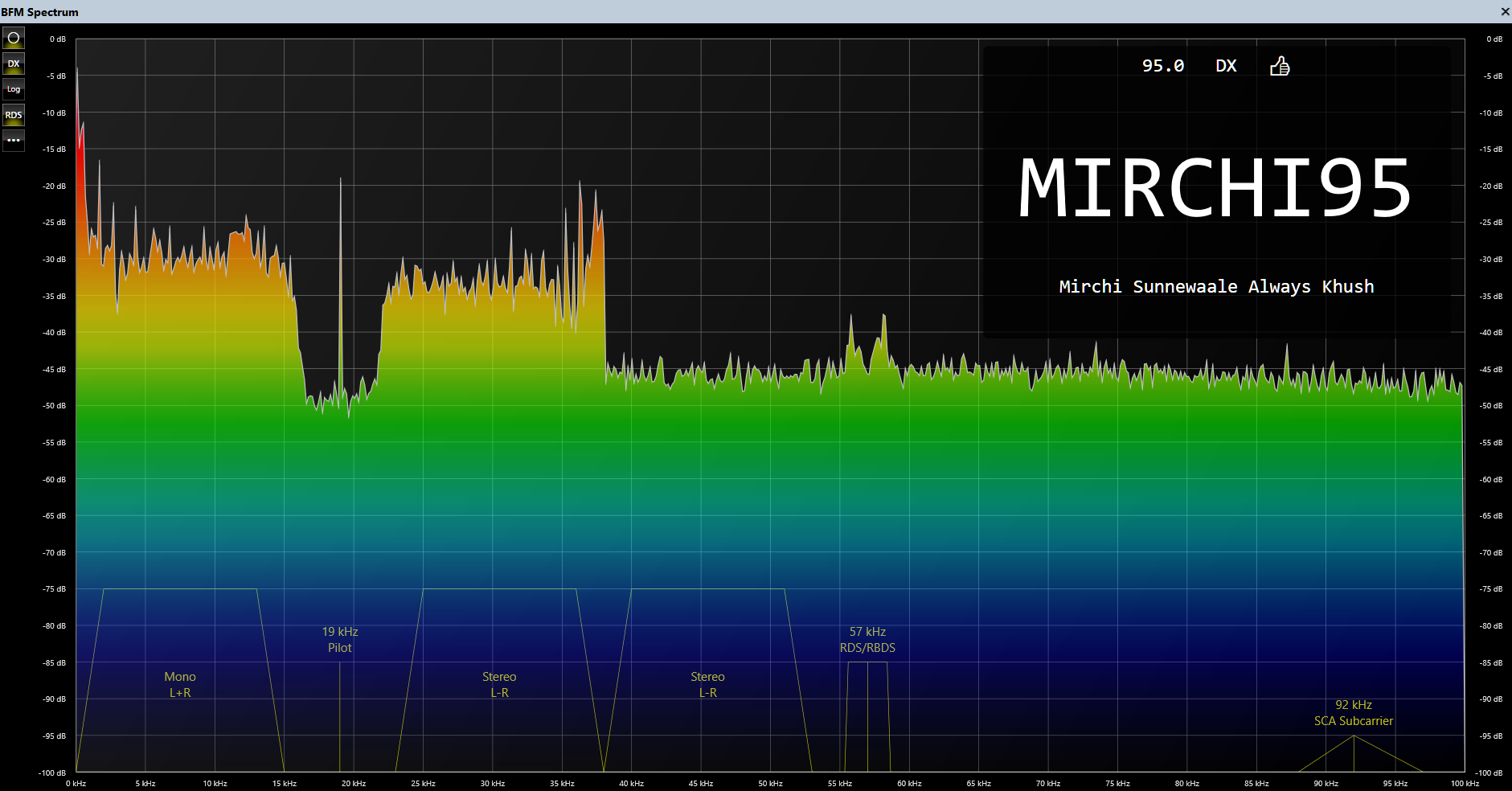
Radio Spectrum of an FM Radio Broadcast channel as decoded by SDRConsole application. Shows the Pilot Signal at 19kHz, Mono, Stereo and RDS spectrum blocks.

If no 19 kHz pilot tone is present, then any signals in the 23–53 kHz range are ignored by a stereo receiver. A guard band of ±4 kHz (15–23 kHz) protects the pilot tone from interference from the baseband audio signal (50 Hz–15 kHz) and from the lower sideband of the double sideband stereo information (23–53 kHz). The third harmonic of the pilot (57 kHz) is used for Radio Data System. The fourth harmonic (76 kHz) is used for Data Radio Channel.

=== AM Radio ===
In AM stereo, the bandwidth is too narrow to accommodate subcarriers, so the modulation itself is changed, and the pilot tone is infrasonic (below the normal hearing range, instead of above it) at a frequency of 25 Hz.

=== Television ===
In some color television standards, the color burst placed after every sync pulse on visible lines (as done in PAL and NTSC) is the pilot signal to indicate that there are color subcarriers present and allow synchronizing the phase of the local oscillator in the demodulation circuitry. However, SECAM features continuous subcarriers which don't need their phase tracked due to being frequency-modulated as compared to the QAM approach of the other systems, thus making it unnecessary.

In the NTSC television system, a pilot tone of 9/572 MHz (15,734.27 Hz) is used to indicate the presence of MTS stereo.

=== Video Recording ===
In some analog video formats frequency modulation is the standard method for recording the luminance part of the signal, and is used to record a composite video signal in direct color systems, e.g. Video 2000 and some Hi-band formats a pilot tone is added to the signal to detect and correct timebase errors.

=== Cable ===
In cable service plant infrastructures, two or more pilot frequencies are used to allow network amplifiers to automatically adjust their gain over temperature swings. This is done by the amplifiers having special circuitry that track the frequencies in order to maintain a consistent gain. Without this capability, network amplifiers may drive the signal too strongly or weakly, thus requiring constant adjustment. Pilot frequencies can be generated by an agile modulator, taking the space of analog NTSC channels, or by dedicated equipment. Sometimes it is necessary to employ several independent pilot frequencies. Most radio relay systems use radio or continuity pilots of their own but transmit also the pilot frequencies belonging to the carrier frequency multiplex system.

== See also ==
- Syncword
- Synchronous Idle
- Pilottone
