= Tikker =

Electronic component

A tikker, alternately spelled ticker, was a vibrating interrupter used in early wireless telegraphy radio receivers such as crystal radio receivers in order to receive continuous wave (CW) radiotelegraphy signals.

In the early years of the 20th century, before modern AM or FM radio transmission was developed, radio transmitters communicated information by radiotelegraphy; the transmitter was switched off and on by the operator with a telegraph key, producing pulses of radio waves, to spell out text messages in Morse code. Around 1905 the first continuous wave radio transmitters began to replace the earlier spark transmitters. The Morse code signal of the spark transmitter consisted of pulses of radio waves called damped waves which repeated at an audio rate, so they were audible as a buzz or tone in a receiver's earphones. In contrast the new continuous wave transmitters produced a signal consisting of pulses of continuous waves, unmodulated sinusoidal carrier waves, which were inaudible in the earphones. So to receive this new modulation method, the receiver had to produce a tone during the pulses of carrier.

The "tikker", invented in 1908 by Valdemar Poulsen, was the first primitive device that did this. It consisted of a vibrating switch contact between the receiver's detector and earphone, which was repeatedly opened by an electromagnet. It functioned as a crude modulator; it interrupted the signal from the detector at an audio rate, producing a buzz in the earphone whenever the carrier was present. Thus the "dots" and "dashes" of the Morse code were made audible.

Around 1915 the tikker was replaced by a better means of accomplishing the same thing; the heterodyne receiver invented by Reginald Fessenden in 1902. In this an electronic oscillator generated a radio signal at a frequency f_{o} offset from the incoming radio wave carrier f_{C}. This was applied to the rectifying detector with the radio carrier. In the detector the two signals mixed, creating a heterodyne (beat) signal at the difference f_{C} - f_{0} between these frequencies, which was in the audio frequency range. The heterodyne provided the audible tone in the earphone whenever the carrier was present. After vacuum tube oscillators were invented in 1913 by Alexander Meissner the heterodyne receiver replaced the tikker. Today the heterodyne method is still used to receive CW signals, and the beat frequency oscillator (BFO) is a standard part of all communications receivers.
