= Rudolf Goldschmidt =

German inventor (1876–1950)

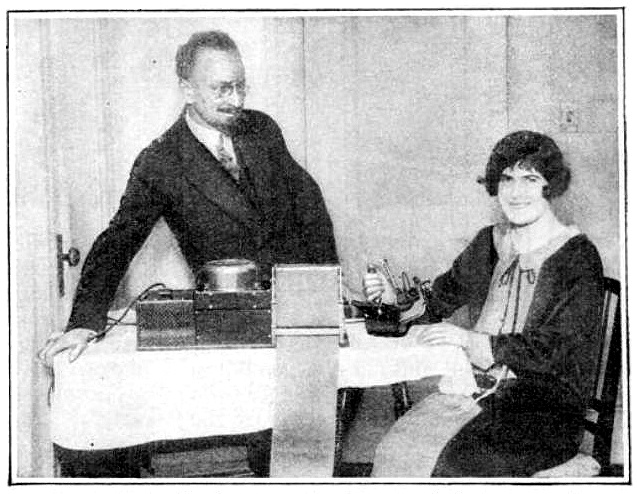
- Goldschmidt demonstrating a heart monitor (1927)
- Born: March 19, 1876; Neubukow, Mecklenburg-Schwerin
- Died: October 30, 1950 (aged 74); London
- Occupation: Inventor
- Spouse: Hella Gimpel

Rudolf Goldschmidt (1876–1950) was a German engineer and inventor, best known for the development of the Goldschmidt alternator radio transmitter, and the tone wheel receiver.

== Biography ==
=== Early life ===
Goldschmidt was born on March 19, 1876, in Neubukow, Mecklenburg, Germany, and grew up in that country. He studied engineering at Charlottenburg and Darmstadt Technical High School, and was awarded an electrical engineer degree at Technische Hochschule Darmstadt in January 1898. Beginning in 1899 he published numerous articles on various branches of electrical engineering. In 1900 he received a college and traveling scholarship, and visited engineering works in Belgium, England, and France. Later that year he was appointed engineer in the laboratory of the Allgemeine Elektricitäts-Gesellschaft AG (AEG) in Berlin. In 1901-1902 he was chief laboratory engineer and designer for Kolben and Company, Ltd., in Prague. He came to England in connection with the Willesden Electricity Supply Station, and was later appointed chief engineer to Crompton and Company in Chelmsford. In 1905 he joined the Westinghouse Company at Manchester.

After passing the German abitur-examination he was awarded an Engineering doctorate degree. In 1907 he returned to Germany as lecturer at Darmstadt Technical College, began working as a consulting engineer, and worked on several inventions, primarily with designing high-frequency alternator transmitters for radio-telegraphy. In 1911 he became manager of Hochfrequenz-Maschinen Aktiengesellschaft für drahtlose Telegraphie (HOMAG) in Berlin, a company formed to promote his radio inventions.

In 1905 Goldschmidt married journalist Hella Gimpel (1883–1933), sister of the painter Bruno Gimpel, and subsequently had three sons and a daughter.

=== Radio inventions ===
In 1908 he developed the Goldschmidt alternator, an early radio transmitter that employed rotating elements and was one of the first continuous wave transmitters. These were manufactured by the HOMAG company for use in high power longwave radio stations conducting intercontinental radiotelegraph traffic. Large 100-kilowatt Goldschmidt transmitters in Eilvese, Germany and Tuckerton, New Jersey, USA were used in the first direct communications link between Germany and the United States, which was inaugurated on 19 June 1914 with a ceremonial exchange of telegrams between Kaiser Wilhelm II and President Woodrow Wilson. Alternator radio transmitters were used into the 1920s, when they were replaced by vacuum tube transmitters.

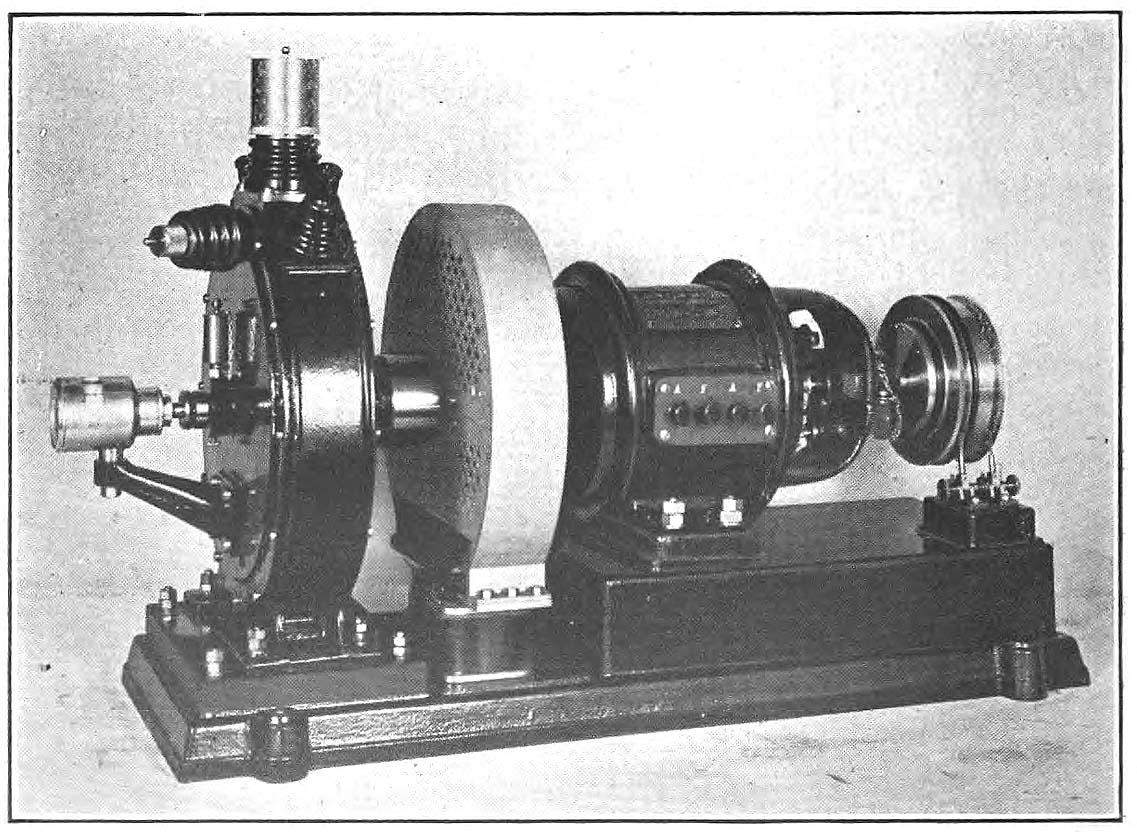
Goldschmidt tone wheel used at the Tuckerton, New Jersey transatlantic receiving station.

He also invented the Goldschmidt tone wheel, a mechanical device used in early radio receivers to receive the new continuous wave signals. The first type of radio transmitter, the spark-gap transmitter, produced strings of damped waves that were heard as a buzz or tone in a receiver, so the radio wave pulses used to transmit Morse code were audible as "beeps". However, the unmodulated signals produced by early continuous wave (also known as "undamped") transmitters like the Goldschmidt alternator were inaudible in receivers designed for reception of spark transmissions. To make continuous wave signals audible, the tone wheel receiver used the heterodyne principle to convert the received transmission into an audio frequency tone.

The tone wheel was a disk with contacts around the rim, spun by a small electric motor, which interrupted the incoming radio signal at a slightly different radio frequency rate than the one used by the transmission. The tone wheel acted as a simple beat frequency oscillator (BFO), and its radio frequency, when combined with the received signal, created an audible "beat" (heterodyne) tone with a frequency that was the difference between the two rates. For example, if the transmitted frequency was 60,000 Hz, the tone wheel could be adjusted to 59,000 Hz, creating a 1,000 Hz tone which could be heard in the earphones as a musical "beep" whenever the carrier was present.

The tone wheel was used for a short period until the 1920s, when it was replaced by the vacuum tube regenerative receiver. Later the tone wheel was used as a musical tone generating device in early electronic organs.

=== Later life ===
During the 1920s, Goldschmidt directed an industrial research lab in Berlin. Here he met Albert Einstein. In 1928, a singer with whom the physicist was acquainted suffered a hearing loss, which set Einstein to thinking about hearing aids. Soon he had an idea and asked Goldschmidt to help him develop a working model. A German patent was issued to Goldschmidt and Einstein on 10 January 1934.

In 1934, Goldschmidt and his children emigrated to England. He kept up his correspondence with Einstein until his death in Bournemouth in 1950.
