= Eilvese transmitter =

Former long-distance radiotelegraphy station at Eilvese, Germany

Coordinates: 52°32′47″N 9°24′53″E

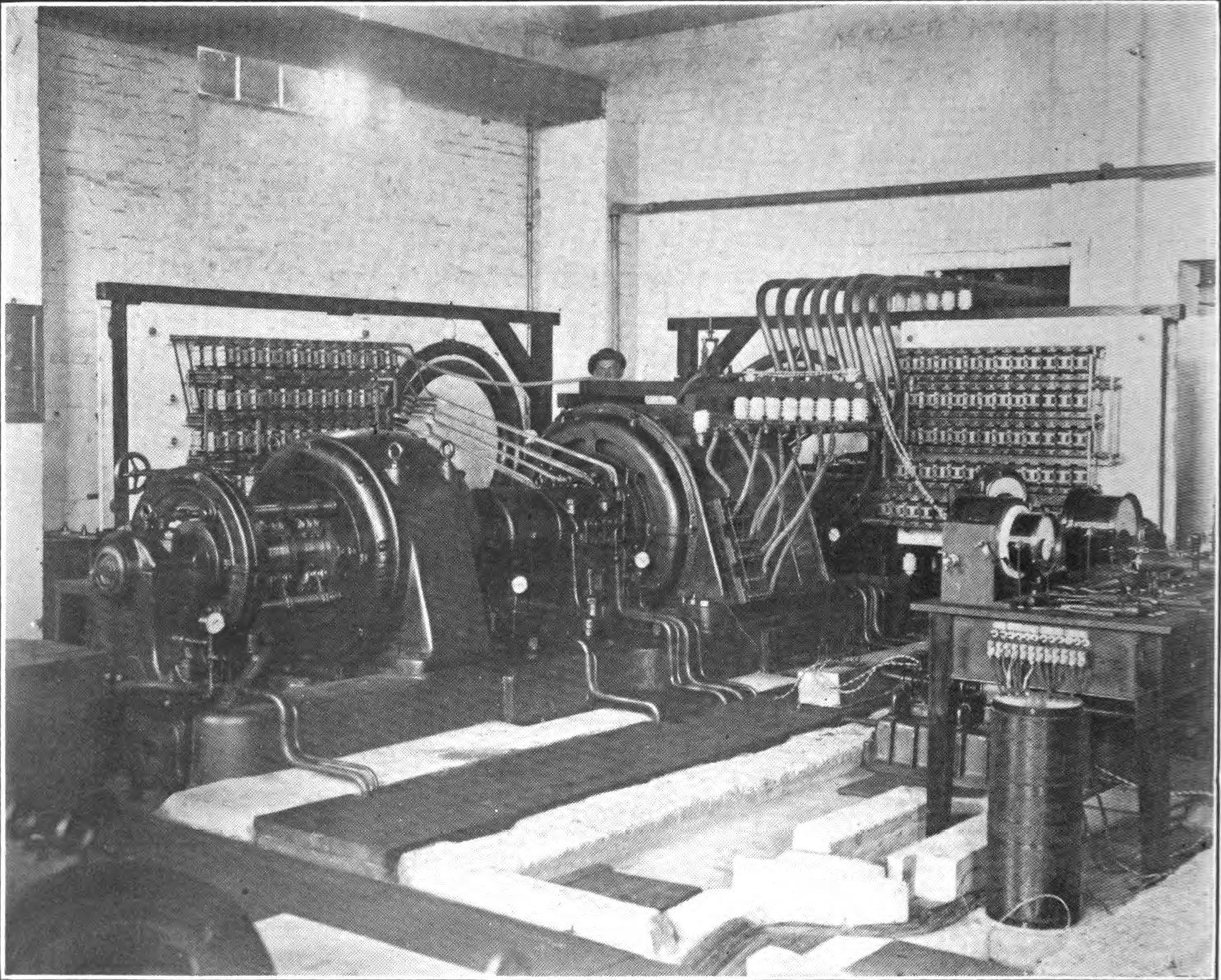
The 100 kW Goldschmidt alternator at Eilvese transmitted at 96 kHz. A 250 HP DC electric motor (at right of picture), turned the 5-tonne (11,000 lb) rotor with a diameter of 0.91 metres (3 ft) (in centre of picture) at 4000 RPM, generating radio waves. The transmitter was used for transatlantic radiotelegraphy traffic, exchanging Morse code messages with a similar Goldschmidt station at Tuckerton, New Jersey, USA.

Eilvese transmitter was an early long-distance radiotelegraphy station at Eilvese, Germany owned by Transradio AG, used for transmission of telegrams. It went into service in 1913, exchanging commercial and diplomatic Morse code traffic on VLF frequencies with Germany's colonies, and a similar station at Tuckerton, New Jersey, USA. During World War I when the allies cut Germany's submarine telegraph cables it was one of two long-distance radiotelegraphy stations which maintained Germany's contact with the rest of the world, and was used for diplomatic negotiations between Woodrow Wilson and Kaiser Wilhelm II leading to the 1918 Armistice which ended World War I.

It transmitted on 96 kHz with a 100 kW Goldschmidt alternator. There were two antennas: an umbrella antenna, which was mounted in the middle on a 250-metre-tall (820 ft) guyed mast, and at the sides by six 20-metre-tall (66 ft) wooden masts and a ring antenna, which was spun between the central mast and the radial masts. The central mast, which was grounded, but at a height of 145 metres (476 ft) divided by glass insulators, was, when built, the tallest structure in Germany.

The umbrella antenna was used for frequencies around 30 kHz, the ring antenna for frequencies around 20 kHz. In 1915 the wooden ring masts were replaced by six 122-metre-tall (400 ft) guyed lattice steel masts. These masts were replaced between 1922 and 1925 by four guyed masts 139 metres (456 ft) tall, which were arranged in a semicircle. Between these masts and the central masts three triangular antennas were installed.

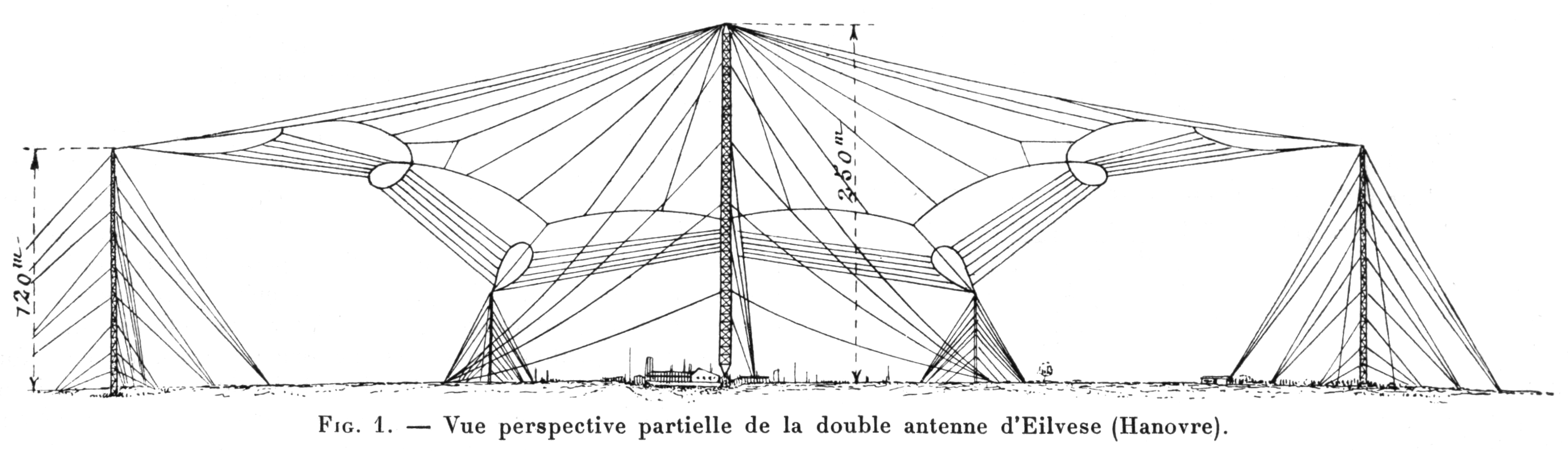
Perspective view of the antenna in 1923

In November 1928 the Reichspost central office started to examine how useful it would be to buy the station. Although the station, which was last used on 15 April 1929, did not meet the technical requirements it was bought in 1930 by the Reichspost.

However, it was uneconomical to modernise the station and so it was dismantled in 1931. Today there is only the office left, which is used as a dwelling. From the former transmitter building there are some wall remnants left. When digging for peat one can still find remains of the antenna, as the central mast fell to the ground in 1931.
