= Alexanderson alternator =

High-frequency AC generator for radio transmission

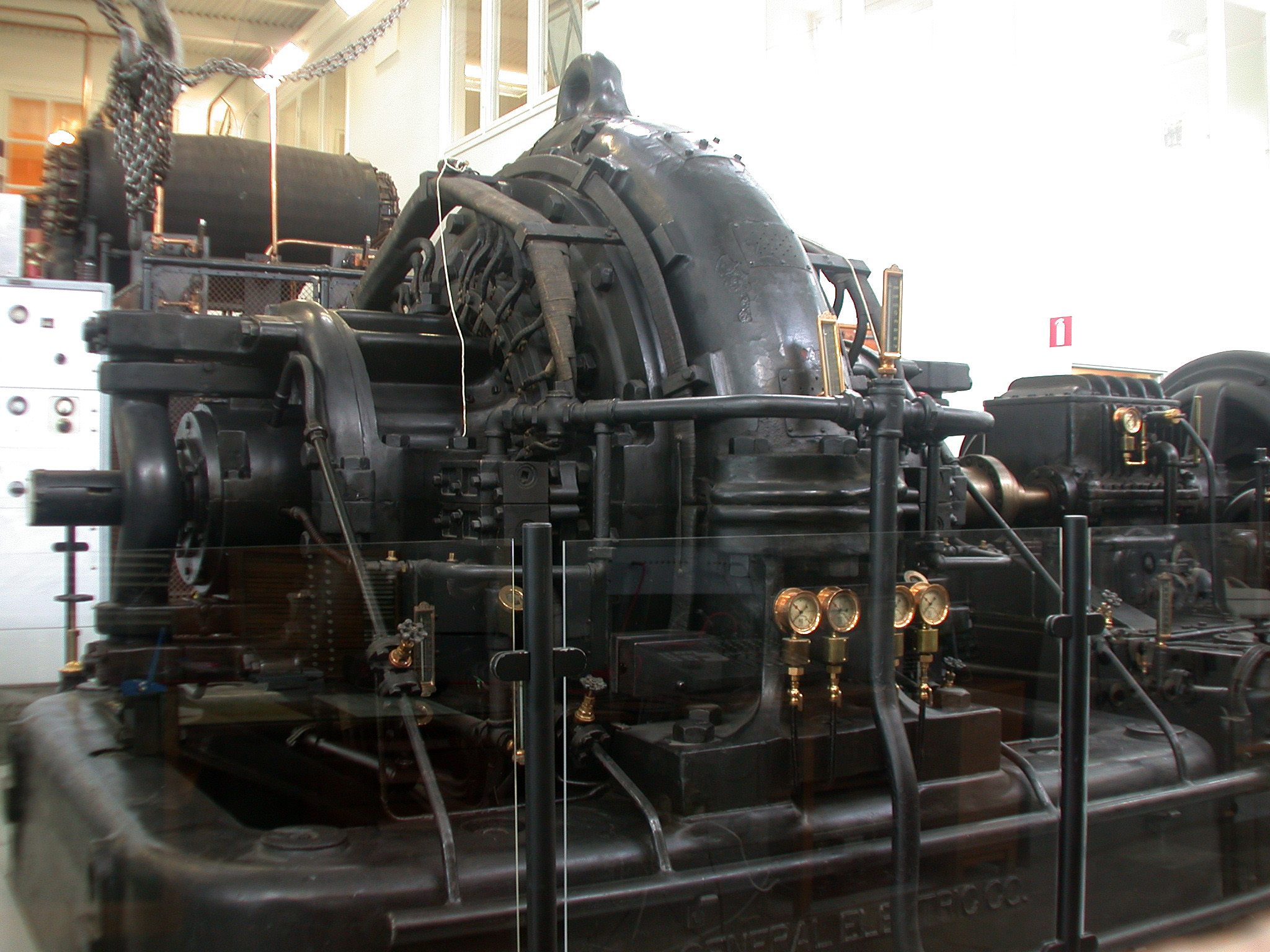
- 200 kW Alexanderson alternator preserved at the Grimeton radiotelegraphy station, Sweden, the only remaining example of an Alexanderson transmitter
- Classification: Alternator
- Industry: Telecommunications
- Application: Signal transmission
- Inventor: Ernst Alexanderson
- Invented: 1904 (122 years ago)

An Alexanderson alternator is a rotating machine, developed by Ernst Alexanderson beginning in 1904, for the generation of high-frequency alternating current for use as a radio transmitter. It was one of the first devices capable of generating the continuous radio waves needed for transmission of amplitude modulated (AM) signals by radio. It was used from about 1910 in a few "superpower" longwave radiotelegraphy stations to transmit transoceanic message traffic by Morse code to similar stations all over the world.

Although superseded in the early 1920s by the development of vacuum-tube transmitters, the Alexanderson alternator continued to be used until World War II. It is on the list of IEEE Milestones as a key achievement in electrical engineering.

== History ==
=== Prior developments ===
After radio waves were discovered in 1887, the first generation of radio transmitters, the spark gap transmitters, produced strings of damped waves, pulses of radio waves which died out to zero quickly. By the 1890s it was realized that damped waves had disadvantages: their energy was spread over a broad frequency band so transmitters on different frequencies interfered with each other, and they could not be modulated with an audio signal to transmit sound. Efforts were made to invent transmitters that would produce continuous waves – a sinusoidal alternating current at a single frequency.

In an 1891 lecture, Frederick Thomas Trouton pointed out that if an electrical alternator were run at a great enough cycle speed (that is, if it turned fast enough and was built with a large enough number of magnetic poles on its armature), it would generate continuous waves at radio frequency. Starting with Elihu Thomson in 1889, a series of researchers built high-frequency alternators: Nikola Tesla (1891, 15 kHz), Salomons and Pyke (1891, 9 kHz), Parsons and Ewing (1892, 14 kHz), Siemens (5 kHz), B. G. Lamme (1902, 10 kHz), but none reached the frequencies required for radio transmission, above 20 kHz.

=== Construction ===
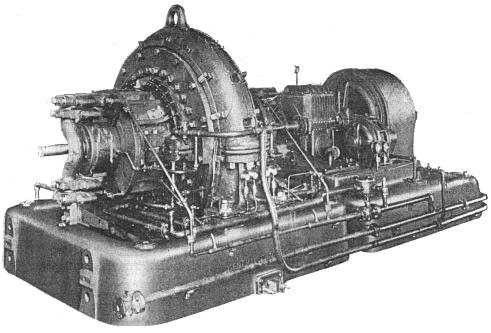
Alexanderson 200 kW motor–alternator set installed at the US Navy's New Brunswick, NJ station, 1920

In 1904, Reginald Fessenden contracted with General Electric for an alternator that generated a frequency of 100,000 hertz for continuous wave radio. The alternator was designed by Ernst Alexanderson. The Alexanderson alternator was extensively used for long-wave radio communications by shore stations, but was too large and heavy to be installed on most ships. In 1906 the first 50 kW alternators were delivered. One went to Reginald Fessenden at Brant Rock, Massachusetts, another to John Hays Hammond, Jr. in Gloucester, Massachusetts and another to the American Marconi Company in New Brunswick, New Jersey.

Alexanderson would receive a patent in 1911 for his device. The Alexanderson alternator followed Fessenden's rotary spark-gap transmitter as the second radio transmitter to be modulated to carry the human voice. Until the invention of vacuum-tube (valve) oscillators in 1913 such as the Armstrong oscillator, the Alexanderson alternator was an important high-power radio transmitter, and allowed amplitude modulation radio transmission of the human voice. The last remaining operable Alexanderson alternator is at the VLF transmitter Grimeton in Sweden and was in regular service until 1996. It continues to be operated for a few minutes on Alexanderson Day, which is either the last Sunday in June or first Sunday in July every year.

=== World War I and the formation of RCA ===
The outbreak of World War I forced European nations to temporarily abandon development of international radio communications networks, while the United States increased efforts to develop transoceanic radio. By the end of the war the Alexanderson alternator was operating to reliably provide transoceanic radio service. British Marconi offered General Electric $5,000 in business in exchange for exclusive rights to use the alternator, but just as the deal was about to go through, the American president Woodrow Wilson requested that GE decline the offer, which would have given the British (who were the leader in submarine communications cables) dominance over worldwide radio communications. GE complied with the request and joined with American Telephone and Telegraph (AT&T), the United Fruit Company, the Western Electric Company, and the Westinghouse Electric and Manufacturing Company to form the Radio Corporation of America (RCA), giving American companies control of American radio for the first time.

=== Stations ===
Thorn L. Mayes identified the production of ten pairs of 200 kW Alexanderson alternators, totaling twenty transmitters, in the period up to 1924:

No.	Location	Call sign	Wavelength (m)	Frequency (kHz)	Installed	Idled	Scrapped	Remarks
1	New Brunswick, New Jersey, US	WII	13,761	21.8	6/1918	1948	1953	Replaced a 50 kW alternator installed in February 1917
2	New Brunswick, New Jersey, US	WRT	13,274	22.6	2/1920	1948	1953	
3	Marion, Massachusetts, US	WQR	13,423	22.3	4/1920	1932	1961	Replaced a Marconi timed spark transmitter
4	Marion, Massachusetts, US	WSO	11,628	25.8	7/1922	1932	1969	To Haiku, Hawaii in 1942
5	Bolinas, California, US	KET	13,100	22.9	10/1920	1930	1946	Replaced a Marconi timed spark transmitter
6	Bolinas, California, US	KET	15,600	19.2	1921	1930	1969	To Haiku, Hawaii in 1942
7	Radio Central, Rocky Point, New York, US	WQK	16,484	18.2	11/1921	1948	1951	
8	Radio Central, Rocky Point, New York, US	WSS	15,957	18.8	1921	1948		To Marion, Massachusetts 1949. Later Smithsonian Institution.
9	Kahuku, Hawaii, US	KGI	16,120	18.6	1920	1930	1938	
10	Kahuku, Hawaii, US	KIE	16,667	18.0	1921	1930	1938	
11	Tuckerton, New Jersey, US	WCI	16,304	18.4	3/1921	1948	1955	Replaced a Goldschmidt alternator
12	Tuckerton, New Jersey, US	WGG	13,575	22.1	1922	1948	1955	
13	Caernarvon, Wales, UK	MUU	14,111	21.2	4/1921		1939	
14	Caernarvon, Wales, UK	GLC	9,592	31.3	1921		1939	
15	Varberg, Sweden	SAQ	17,442	17.2	1924	1946	1960	Initially 18.600 m, parallel connection
16	Varberg, Sweden	SAQ	17,442	17.2	1924	1946	Operational	Preserved at Grimeton, Sweden
17	Warsaw, Poland	AXO	21,127	14.2	12/1923			Seized by German army 9/1939, who destroyed the stations in 1945
18	Warsaw, Poland	AXL	18,293	16.4	1923			Seized by German army 9/1939, who destroyed the stations in 1945
19	Pernambuco, Recife, Brazil				never		1927	Delivered 1924, returned to Radio Central Rocky Point in 1926 because more efficient vacuum tube transmitters were then available
20	Pernambuco, Recife, Brazil				never		1927	Delivered 1924, returned to Radio Central Rocky Point in 1926 because more efficient vacuum tube transmitters were then available

=== U.S. military use during and after World War II ===
Beginning in 1941, seven of the twenty original 200 kW alternators were put into service by the U.S. Navy and Air Force:

No.	Location	Call sign	Original location	Navy operation	Air Force operation	Scrapped
1	Haiku, Hawaii		Marion, Massachusetts (WSO)	1942–1946	1947–1957	1969
2	Haiku, Hawaii		Bolinas, California (KET)	1942–1946	1947–1957	1969
3	Marion, Massachusetts		Marion, Massachusetts (WQR)	1941–1948	1949–1957	1961
4	Marion, Massachusetts	AFA2	Radio Central (WSS)		1949–1957	Smithsonian
5	Tuckerton, New Jersey		Tuckerton, New Jersey (WCI)	1942–1948		1955
6	Tuckerton, New Jersey		Tuckerton, New Jersey (WGG)	1942–1948		1955
7	Bolinas, California		Bolinas, California (KET)	1942–1946		1946

During World War II the U.S. Navy recognized the need for reliable distant longwave (VLF) transmissions to the Pacific fleet. A new facility was constructed at Haiku in Hawaii, where two 200 KW Alexanderson alternators transferred from the mainland were installed. The Navy also operated an existing transmitter at Bolinas, California, again for Pacific ocean communication. Both Haiku alternators were sold for salvage in 1969, possibly to Kreger Company of California.

In the late 1940s the Air Force assumed control of the Haiku and Marion, Massachusetts facilities. The Air Force found that longwave transmissions were more reliable than shortwave when sending weather information to Arctic researchers as well as bases in Greenland, Labrador, and Iceland. The two Marion transmitters were used until 1957. One was scrapped in 1961 and the other was reportedly handed over to the U.S. Bureau of Standards and stored in a Smithsonian Institution warehouse.

== Design ==
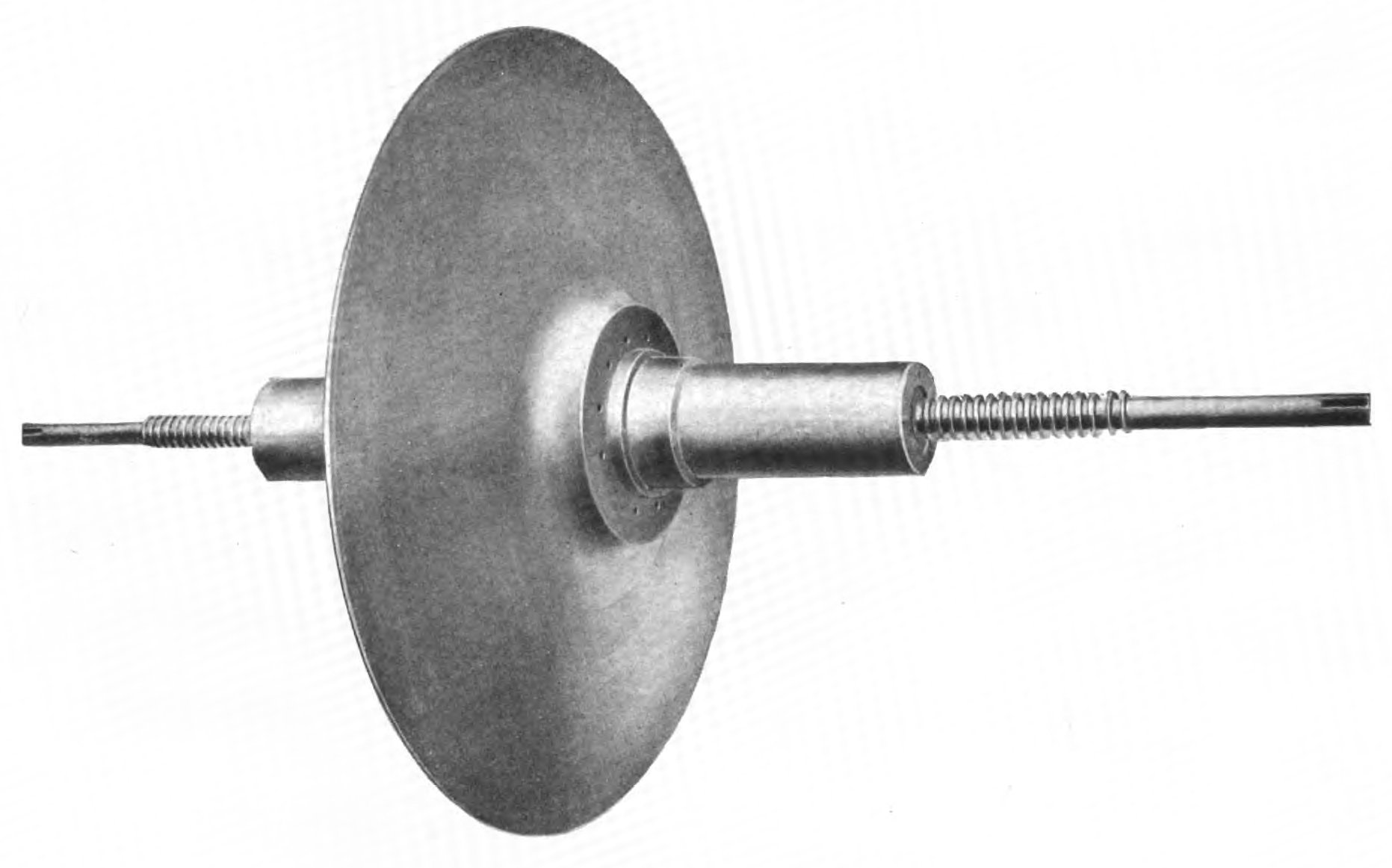
Rotor of 200 kW alternator

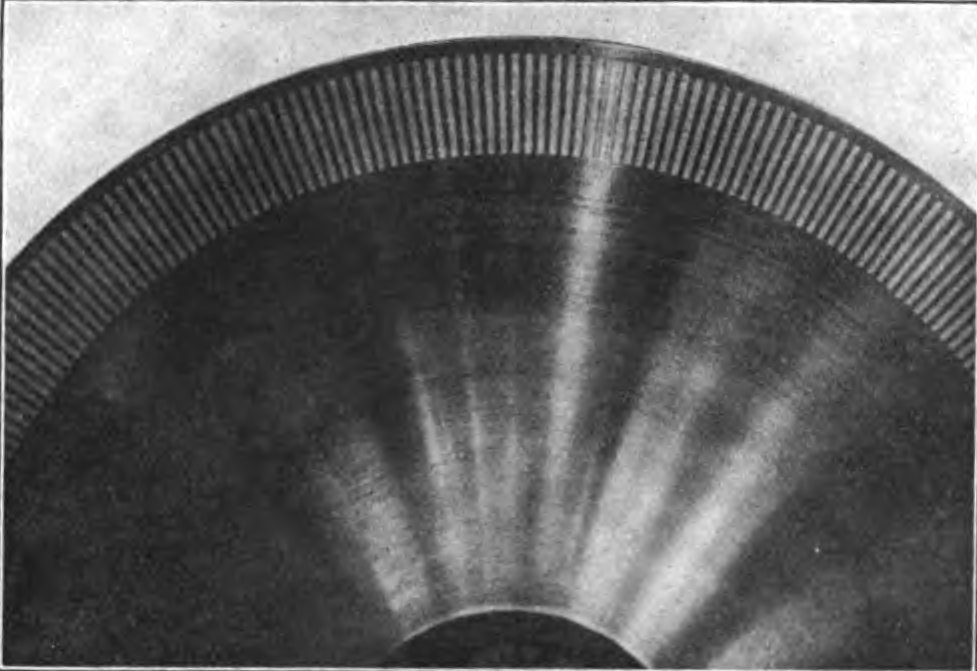
Closeup of above rotor. It has 300 narrow slots cut through the rotor. The "teeth" between the slots are the magnetic poles of the machine.

The Alexanderson alternator works similarly to an AC electric generator, but generates higher-frequency current, in the very low frequency (VLF) radio frequency range. The rotor has no conductive windings or electrical connections; it consists of a solid disc of high tensile strength magnetic steel, with narrow slots cut in its circumference to create a series of narrow "teeth" that function as magnetic poles. The space between the teeth is filled with nonmagnetic material, to give the rotor a smooth surface to decrease aerodynamic drag. The rotor is turned at a high speed by an electric motor through a speed–increaser gearbox.

The machine operates by variable reluctance (similar to an electric guitar pickup), changing the magnetic flux linking two coils. The periphery of the rotor is embraced by a circular iron stator with a C-shaped cross-section, divided into narrow poles, the same number as the rotor has, carrying two sets of coils. One set of coils is energized with direct current and produces a magnetic field in the air gap in the stator, which passes axially (sideways) through the rotor.

As the rotor turns, alternately either an iron section of the disk is in the gap between each pair of stator poles, allowing a high magnetic flux to cross the gap, or else a non-magnetic slot is in the stator gap, allowing less magnetic flux to pass. Thus the magnetic flux through the stator varies sinusoidally at a rapid rate. These changes in flux induce a radio-frequency voltage in a second set of coils on the stator.

The RF collector coils are all interconnected by an output transformer, whose secondary winding is connected to the antenna circuit. Modulation or telegraph keying of the radio frequency energy was done by a magnetic amplifier, which was also used for amplitude modulation and voice transmissions.

The frequency of the current generated by an Alexanderson alternator in hertz is the product of the number of rotor poles and the revolutions per second. Higher radio frequencies thus require more poles, a higher rotational speed, or both. Alexanderson alternators were used to produce radio waves in the very low frequency (VLF) range, for transcontinental wireless communication. A typical alternator with an output frequency of 100 kHz had 300 poles and rotated at 20,000 revolutions per minute (RPM) (333 revolutions per second). To produce high power, the clearance between the rotor and stator had to be kept to only 1 mm. The manufacture of precision machines rotating at such high speeds presented many new problems, and Alexanderson transmitters were bulky and very expensive.

=== Frequency control ===
The output frequency of the transmitter is proportional to the speed of the rotor. To keep the frequency constant, the speed of the electric motor turning it was controlled with a feedback loop. In one method, a sample of the output signal is applied to a high-Q tuned circuit, whose resonant frequency is slightly above the output frequency. The generator's frequency falls on the "skirt" of the LC circuit's impedance curve, where the impedance increases rapidly with frequency. The output of the LC circuit is rectified, and the resulting voltage is compared with a constant reference voltage to produce a feedback signal to control the motor speed. If the output frequency gets too high, the impedance presented by the LC circuit increases, and the amplitude of the RF signal getting through the LC circuit drops. The feedback signal to the motor drops, and the motor slows down. Thus the alternator output frequency is "locked" to the tuned circuit resonant frequency.

The sets were built to operate at wavelengths of 10,500 to 24,000 meters (28.57 to 12.5 kHz). This was accomplished by three design variables. The alternators were built with 1220, 976 or 772 poles. Three gearboxes were available with ratios of 2.675, 2.973 and 3.324 and the 900 RPM driving motor was operated at slips of 4% to 20%, giving speeds of 864 to 720 RPM. Transmitters installed in Europe, operating on 50 Hz power, had a wavelength range of 12,500 to 28,800 meters due to the lower speed of the driving motor.

== Performance advantages ==
A large Alexanderson alternator might produce 500 kW of output radio-frequency energy and would be water- or oil-cooled. One such machine had 600 pole pairs in the stator winding, and the rotor was driven at 2170 RPM, for an output frequency near 21.7 kHz. To obtain higher frequencies, higher rotor speeds were required, up to 20,000 RPM.

Along with the arc converter invented in 1903, the Alexanderson alternator was one of the first radio transmitters that generated continuous waves. In contrast, the earlier spark-gap transmitters generated a string of damped waves. These were electrically "noisy"; the energy of the transmitter was spread over a wide frequency range, so they interfered with other transmissions and operated inefficiently. With a continuous-wave transmitter, all of the energy was concentrated within a narrow frequency band, so for a given output power it could communicate over longer distances. In addition, continuous waves could be modulated with an audio signal to carry sound. The Alexanderson alternator was one of the first transmitters to be used for AM transmission.

The Alexanderson alternator produced "purer" continuous waves than the arc converter, whose nonsinusoidal output generated significant harmonics, so the alternator was preferred for long-distance telegraphy.

== Disadvantages ==
Because of the extremely high rotational speed compared to a conventional alternator, the Alexanderson alternator required continuous maintenance by skilled personnel. Efficient lubrication and oil or water cooling was essential for reliability, which was difficult to achieve with the lubricants available at the time. In fact, early editions of the Royal Navy's "Admiralty Handbook of Wireless Telegraphy" cover this in considerable detail, mostly as an explanation as to why the navy did not use that particular technology. However, the US Navy did.

Other major problems were that changing the operating frequency was a lengthy and complex process and, unlike a spark transmitter, the carrier signal could not be switched on and off at will. The latter problem greatly complicated "listening through" (that is, stopping the transmission to listen for an answer). There was also the risk that it would allow enemy vessels to detect the presence of the ship.

Because of the limits of the number of poles and rotational speed of a machine, the Alexanderson alternator is capable of generating transmission frequencies up to around 600 kHz in the lower medium wave band, with shortwave and higher frequencies being physically impossible. (Note: Nowadays, it would be technically possible to construct an Alexanderson alternator operating at higher frequencies (for instance, an Alexanderson alternator with a 10,000-pole rotor spinning at 300,000 RPM would produce a transmission frequency of 50 MHz, into the lower portion of the VHF band), but the advances in technology required to allow a large rotor to be spun at the immensely high speeds necessary without suffering catastrophic failure did not occur until long after the Alexanderson alternator had become obsolete.)

== See also ==
- Alexanderson Day
- Goldschmidt alternator
- Joly-Arco and Bethenod-Latour radio frequency alternators
- Grimeton Radio Station
- Resolver (electrical)
- Tonewheel
