= Damped wave (radio transmission) =

Type of spark gap modulation

A series of damped waves, such as would be radiated by a spark-gap transmitter. In this graph, the vertical axis is the amplitude of the wave, in units such as voltage or electric field strength; the horizontal axis is time.

A damped wave was an early method of radio transmission produced by the first radio transmitters (spark gap transmitters) which consisted of a series of damped radio waves. Information was carried on this signal by telegraphy, turning the transmitter on and off (on-off keying) to send messages in Morse code. Damped waves were the first practical means of radio communication, used during the early days of wireless telegraphy before more efficient continuous wave transmitters replaced it over the course of the 1920s.

Such transmissions have a wide bandwidth and generate electrical "noise" (electromagnetic interference) which interferes with other radio transmissions. Because of their potential to cause interference and their resulting wasteful use of radio spectrum resources, the use of damped wave transmission has been prohibited by international regulations since 1934.

== See also ==
- Continuous wave
- Damping ratio
- On-off keying
- Amplitude modulation
- Types of radio emissions
