= Alexander Meissner =

Austrian engineer and physicist

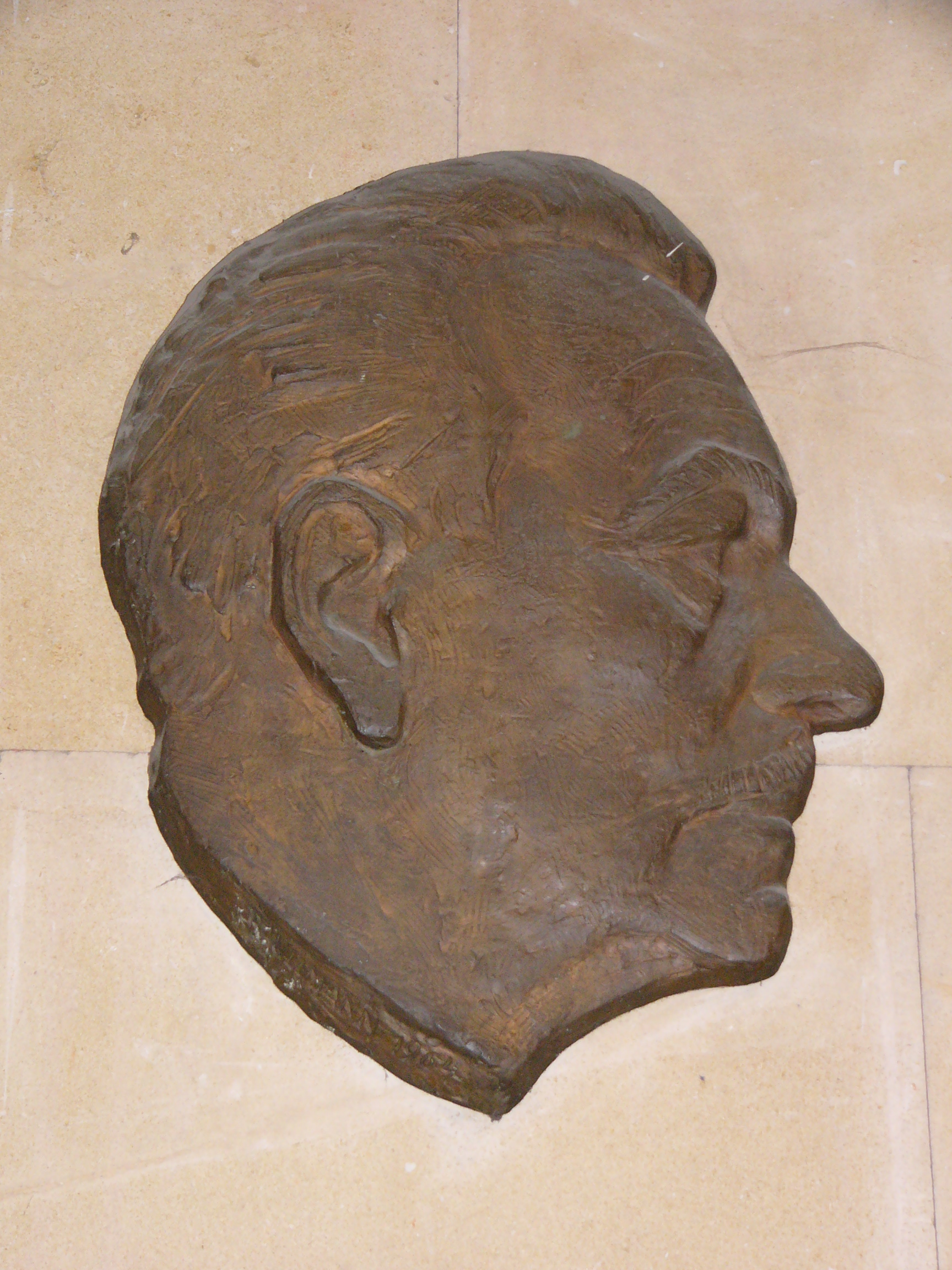
Memorial plaque devoted to Alexander Meissner at the Vienna University of Technology in Vienna, Austria.

Alexander Meissner (September 14, 1883 – January 3, 1958) was an Austrian engineer and physicist. He was born in Vienna and died in Berlin.

His field of interest was: antenna design, amplification and detection advanced the development of radio telegraphy. In March 1913 he discovered the principle of positive feedback independently of Edwin Armstrong, and by applying positive feedback to vacuum tube amplifiers, Meissner co-invented the electronic oscillator, which became the basis of radio transmission by 1920 and has innumerable uses today. The inductively-coupled oscillator circuit he invented is today known as the Meissner oscillator.
