= Wireless telegraphy =

Method of communication by radio waves

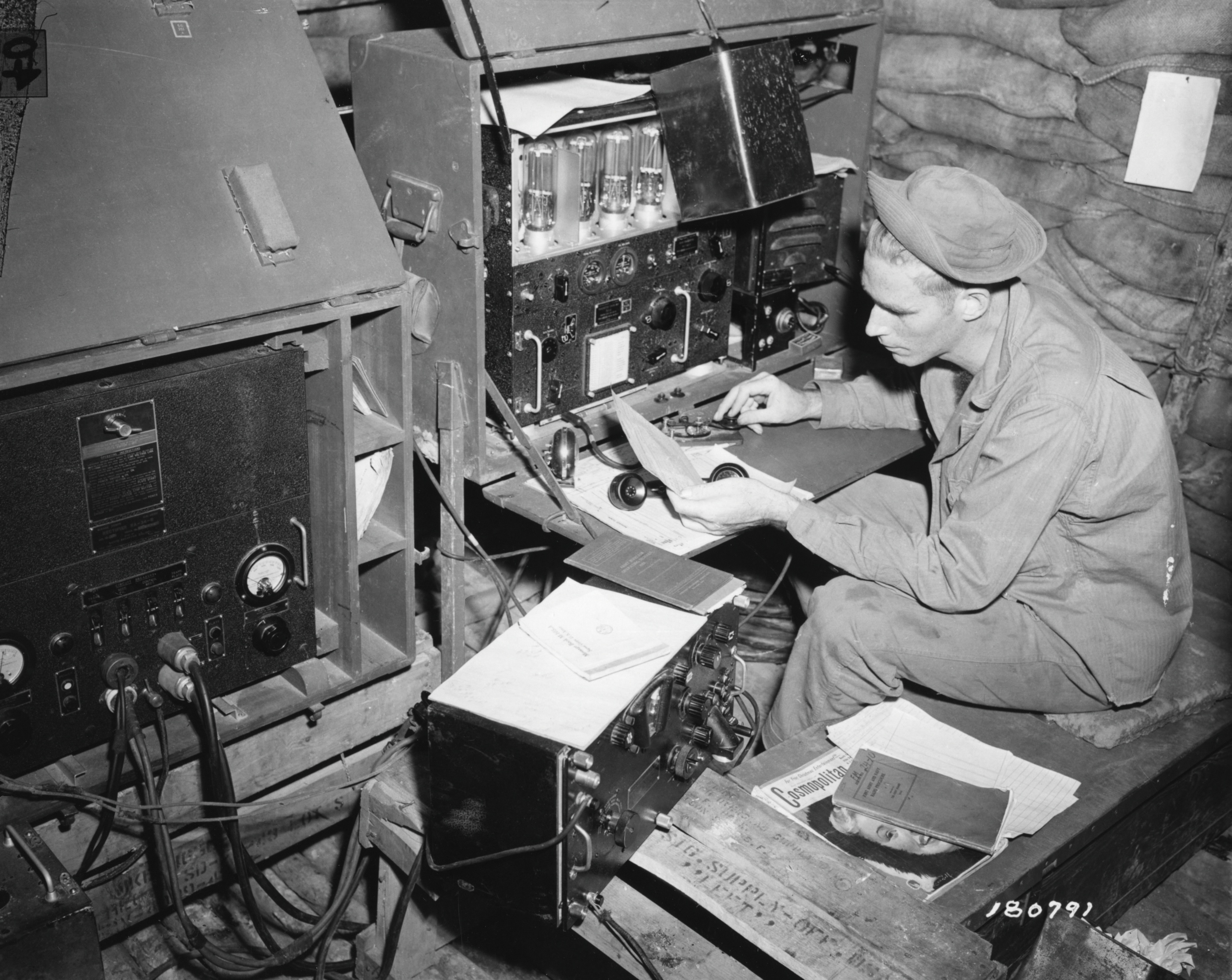
A US Army Signal Corps radio operator in 1943 in New Guinea transmitting by radiotelegraphy

Wireless telegraphy or radiotelegraphy is the transmission of text messages by radio waves, analogous to electrical telegraphy using cables. Before about 1910, the term wireless telegraphy was also used for other experimental technologies for transmitting telegraph signals without wires. In radiotelegraphy, information is transmitted by pulses of radio waves of two different lengths called "dots" and "dashes", which spell out text messages, usually in Morse code. In a manual system, the sending operator taps on a switch called a telegraph key which turns the transmitter on and off, producing the pulses of radio waves. At the receiver the pulses are audible in the receiver's speaker as beeps, which are translated back to text by an operator who knows Morse code.

Radiotelegraphy was the first means of radio communication, with the first practical radio transmitters and receivers invented in 1894–1895 by Marconi. Beginning about 1908, powerful transoceanic radiotelegraphy stations transmitted commercial telegram traffic between countries at rates up to 200 words per minute.

Wireless telegraphy was initially perceived as analogous to electric telegraphy, given its reliance on Morse code, and therefore mistakenly seen as a secure point-to-point channel of communication. The broadcasting function of wireless received conflicting reviews persisting on its nature and purpose well into the 1920s. Wireless telegraphy is often viewed as a predecessor to Radio broadcasting, that sprang after the World War I with development of amplitude modulation (AM) inradiotelephony that allowed sound (audio) and acknowledgement of importance of propagating features of wireless.

Radiotelegraphy was used for long-distance person-to-person commercial, diplomatic, and military text communication throughout the first half of the 20th century. It became a strategically important capability during the two world wars since a nation without long-distance radiotelegraph stations could be isolated from the rest of the world by an enemy cutting its submarine telegraph cables. Radiotelegraphy remains popular in amateur radio. It is also taught by the military for use in emergency communications. However, by the 1950s commercial radiotelegraphy was replaced by radioteletype networks and is obsolete.

== Principles ==
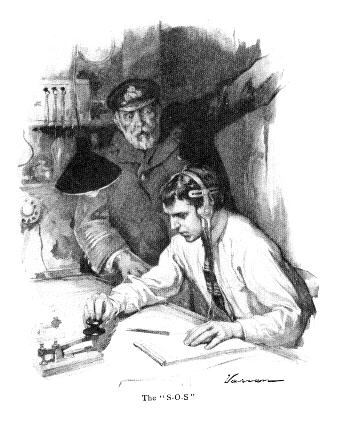
Illustration from 1912 of a radiotelegraph operator on a ship sending an emergency SOS call for help

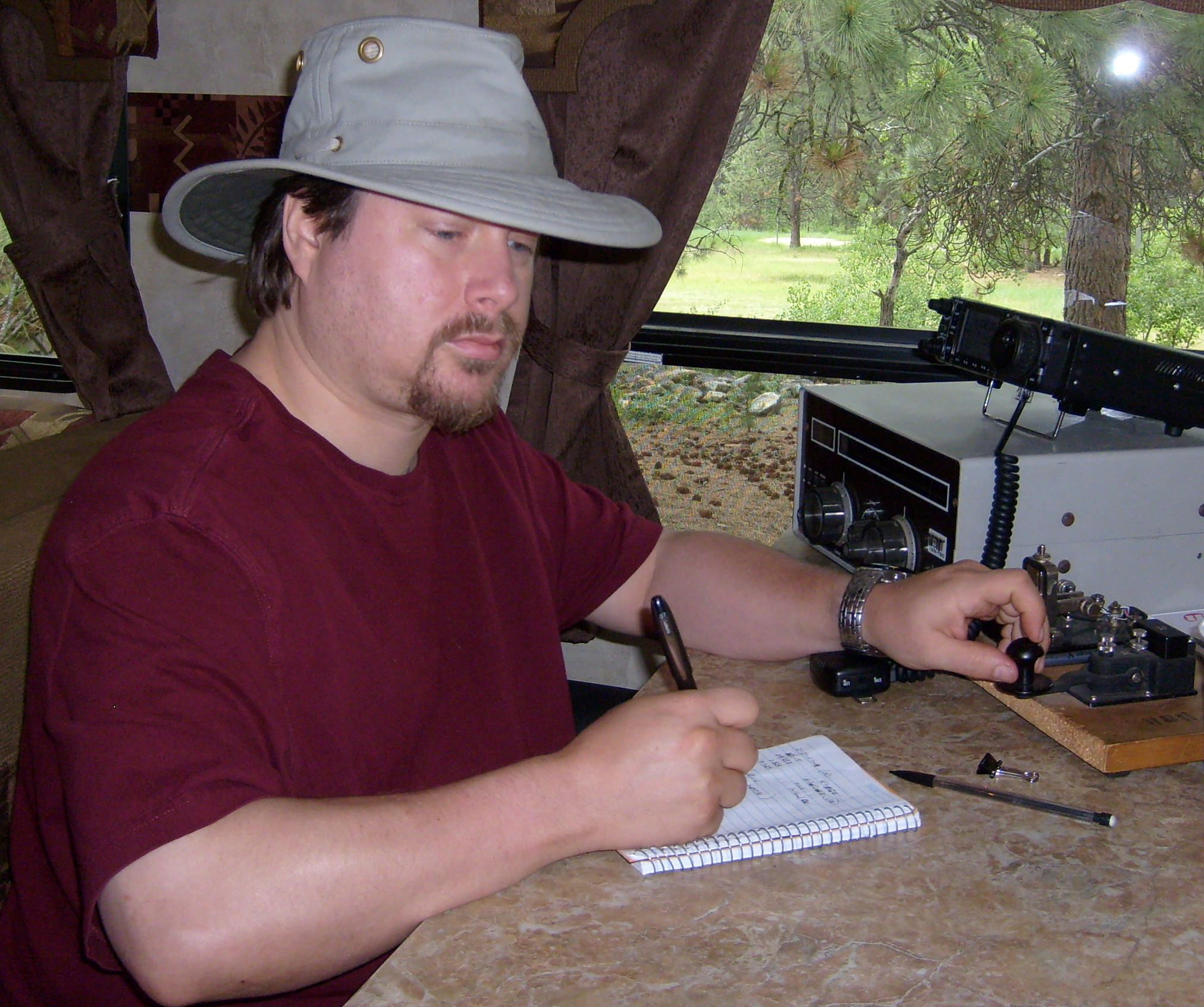
Modern amateur radio operator transmitting Morse code

Wireless telegraphy or radiotelegraphy, commonly called CW (continuous wave), ICW (interrupted continuous wave) transmission, or on-off keying, and designated by the International Telecommunication Union as emission type A1A or A2A, is a radio communication method. It was transmitted by several different modulation methods during its history. The primitive spark-gap transmitters used until 1920 transmitted damped waves, which had very wide bandwidth and tended to interfere with other transmissions. This type of emission was banned by 1934, except for some legacy use on ships. The vacuum tube (valve) transmitters which came into use after 1920 transmitted code by pulses of unmodulated sinusoidal carrier wave called continuous wave (CW), which is still used today. To receive CW transmissions, the receiver requires a circuit called a beat frequency oscillator (BFO). The third type of modulation, frequency-shift keying (FSK) was used mainly by radioteletype networks (RTTY). Morse code radiotelegraphy was gradually replaced by radioteletype in most high volume applications by World War II.

In manual radiotelegraphy the sending operator manipulates a switch called a telegraph key, which turns the radio transmitter on and off, producing pulses of unmodulated carrier wave of different lengths called "dots" and "dashes", which encode characters of text in Morse code. At the receiving location, Morse code is audible in the receiver's earphone or speaker as a sequence of buzzes or beeps, which is translated back to text by an operator who knows Morse code. With automatic radiotelegraphy teleprinters at both ends use a code such as the International Telegraph Alphabet No. 2 and produce typed text.

Radiotelegraphy is obsolete in commercial radio communication, and its last civilian use, requiring maritime shipping radio operators to use Morse code for emergency communications, ended in 1999 when the International Maritime Organization switched to the satellite-based GMDSS system. However it is still used by amateur radio operators, and military services require signalmen to be trained in Morse code for emergency communication. A CW coastal station, KSM, still exists in California, run primarily as a museum by volunteers, and occasional contacts with ships are made. In a minor legacy use, VHF omnidirectional range (VOR) and NDB radio beacons in the aviation radio navigation service still transmit their one to three letter identifiers in Morse code.

Radiotelegraphy is popular amongst radio amateurs world-wide, who commonly refer to it as continuous wave, or just CW. A 2021 analysis of over 700 million communications logged by the Club Log blog, and a similar review of data logged by the American Radio Relay League, both show that wireless telegraphy is the 2nd most popular mode of amateur radio communication, accounting for nearly 20% of contacts. This makes it more popular than voice communication, but not as popular as the FT8 digital mode, which accounted for 60% of amateur radio contacts made in 2021. Since 2003, knowledge of Morse code and wireless telegraphy has no longer been required to obtain an amateur radio license in many countries, it is, however, still required in some countries to obtain a licence of a different class. As of 2021, licence Class A in Belarus and Estonia, or the General class in Monaco, or Class 1 in Ukraine require Morse proficiency to access the full amateur radio spectrum including the high frequency (HF) bands. Further, CEPT Class 1 licence in Ireland, and Class 1 in Russia, both of which require proficiency in wireless telegraphy, offer additional privileges: a shorter and more desirable call sign in both countries, and the right to use a higher transmit power in Russia.

== History ==
=== Landline telegraph networks ===
Efforts to find a way to transmit telegraph signals without wires grew out of the success of electric telegraph networks, the first instant telecommunication systems. Developed beginning in the 1830s, a number of systems using different schemes for transmitting text over wires competed. A Morse telegraph line was a person-to-person text message system consisting of multiple telegraph offices linked by an overhead wire supported on telegraph poles. To send a message, an operator at one office would tap on a switch called a telegraph key, creating pulses of electric current which spelled out a message in Morse code. When the key was pressed, it would connect a battery to the telegraph line, sending current down the wire. At the receiving office, the current pulses would operate a telegraph sounder, a device that would make a "click" sound when it received each pulse of current. The operator at the receiving station who knew Morse code would translate the clicking sounds to text and write down the message. The ground was used as the return path for current in the telegraph circuit, to avoid having to use a second overhead wire.

By the 1860s, the telegraph was the standard way to send most urgent commercial, diplomatic and military messages, and industrial nations had built continent-wide telegraph networks, with submarine telegraph cables allowing telegraph messages to bridge oceans. However installing and maintaining a telegraph line linking distant stations was very expensive, and wires could not reach some locations such as ships at sea. Inventors realized if a way could be found to send electrical impulses of Morse code between separate points without a connecting wire, it could revolutionize communications.

=== Invention of the wireless telegraph ===
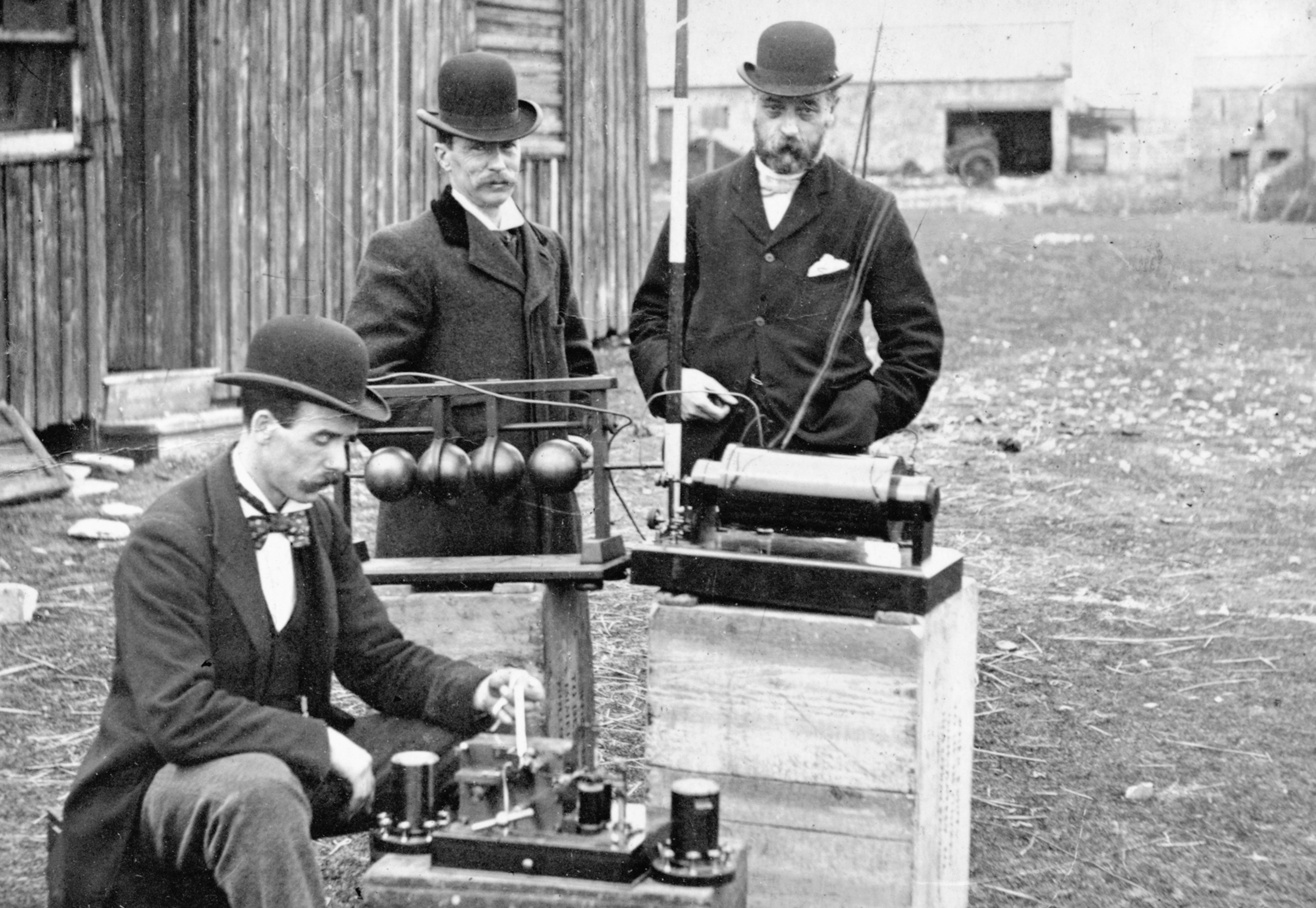
British Post Office engineers inspect Marconi's transmitter (center) and receiver (bottom) on Flat Holm, May 1897

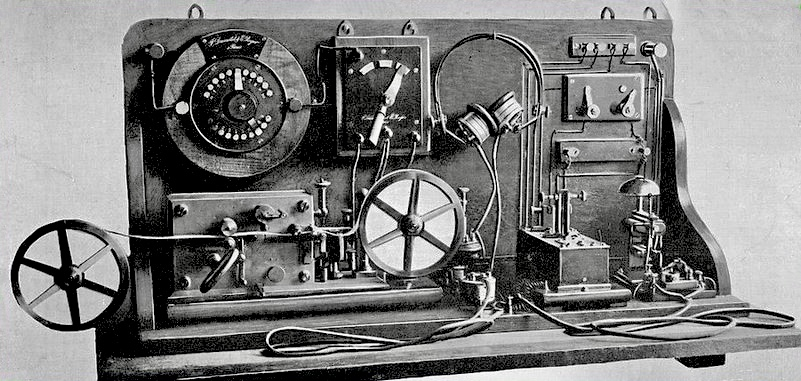
Typical commercial radiotelegraphy receiver from the first decade of the 20th century. The "dots" and "dashes" of Morse code were recorded in ink on paper tape by a siphon recorder (left).

Example of transatlantic radiotelegraph message recorded on paper tape at RCA's New York receiving center in 1920. The translation of the Morse code is given below the tape.

From the 1830s inventors had experimented with a series of unsuccessful technologies to transmit wireless telegraphy: magnetic induction systems, ground conduction, conduction through bodies of water, and light beam systems.

The successful solution to this problem was the discovery of radio waves in 1887 by Heinrich Hertz, and the development of practical radiotelegraphy transmitters and receivers by about 1899.

Over several years starting in 1894, the Italian inventor Guglielmo Marconi worked on adapting the newly discovered phenomenon of radio waves to communication, turning what was essentially a laboratory experiment up to that point into a useful communication system, building the first radiotelegraphy system using them. Preece and the General Post Office (GPO) in Britain at first supported and gave financial backing to Marconi's experiments conducted on Salisbury Plain from 1896. Preece had become convinced of the idea through his experiments with wireless induction. However, the backing was withdrawn when Marconi formed the Wireless Telegraph & Signal Company. GPO lawyers determined that the system was a telegraph under the meaning of the Telegraph Act and thus fell under the Post Office monopoly. This did not seem to hold back Marconi. After Marconi sent wireless telegraphic signals across the Atlantic Ocean in 1901, the system began being used for regular communication including ship-to-shore and ship-to-ship communication.

With this development, wireless telegraphy came to mean radiotelegraphy, Morse code transmitted by radio waves. The first radio transmitters, primitive spark gap transmitters used until World War I, could not transmit voice (audio signals). Instead, the operator would send the text message on a telegraph key, which turned the transmitter on and off, producing short ("dot") and long ("dash") pulses of radio waves, groups of which comprised the letters and other symbols of the Morse code. At the receiver, the signals could be heard as musical "beeps" in the earphones by the receiving operator, who would translate the code back into text. By 1910, communication by what had been called "Hertzian waves" was being universally referred to as "radio", and the term wireless telegraphy has been largely replaced by the more modern term "radiotelegraphy".

== Modulation methods ==
=== Damped waves ===
The primitive spark-gap transmitters used until the 1920s transmitted by a modulation method called damped wave. As long as the telegraph key was pressed, the transmitter would produce a string of transient pulses of radio waves which repeated at an audio rate, usually between 50 and several thousand hertz. In a receiver's earphone, this sounded like a musical tone, rasp or buzz. Thus the Morse code "dots" and "dashes" sounded like beeps. Damped wave had a large frequency bandwidth, meaning that the radio signal was not a single frequency but occupied a wide band of frequencies. Damped wave transmitters had a limited range and interfered with the transmissions of other transmitters on adjacent frequencies.

=== Continuous waves ===
After 1905 new types of radiotelegraph transmitters were invented which transmitted code using a new modulation method: continuous wave (CW) (designated by the International Telecommunication Union as emission type A1A). As long as the telegraph key was pressed, the transmitter produced a continuous sinusoidal wave of constant amplitude. Since all the radio wave's energy was concentrated at a single frequency, CW transmitters could transmit further with a given power, and also caused virtually no interference to transmissions on adjacent frequencies. The first transmitters able to produce continuous wave were the arc converter (Poulsen arc) transmitter, invented by Danish engineer Valdemar Poulsen in 1903, and the Alexanderson alternator, invented 1906–1912 by Reginald Fessenden and Ernst Alexanderson. These slowly replaced the spark transmitters in high power radiotelegraphy stations.

However, the radio receivers used for damped wave could not receive continuous wave. Because the CW signal produced while the key was pressed was just an unmodulated carrier wave, it made no sound in a receiver's earphones. To receive a CW signal, some way had to be found to make the Morse code carrier wave pulses audible in a receiver.

==== The beat frequency oscillator (BFO) ====
This problem was solved by Reginald Fessenden in 1901. In his "heterodyne" receiver, the incoming radiotelegraph signal is mixed in the receiver's detector crystal or vacuum tube with a constant sine wave generated by an electronic oscillator in the receiver called a beat frequency oscillator (BFO). The frequency of the oscillator $f_\text{BFO}$ is offset from the radio transmitter's frequency $f_\text{IN}$. In the detector the two frequencies subtract, and a beat frequency (heterodyne) at the difference between the two frequencies is produced: $f_\text{BEAT} = |f_\text{IN} - f_\text{BFO}|$. If the BFO frequency is near enough to the radio station's frequency, the beat frequency is in the audio frequency range and can be heard in the receiver's earphones. During the "dots" and "dashes" of the signal, the beat tone is produced, while between them there is no carrier so no tone is produced. Thus the Morse code is audible as musical "beeps" in the earphones.

The BFO was rare until the invention in 1913 of the first practical electronic oscillator, the vacuum tube feedback oscillator by Edwin Armstrong. After this time BFOs were a standard part of radiotelegraphy receivers. Each time the radio was tuned to a different station frequency, the BFO frequency had to be changed also, so the BFO oscillator had to be tunable. In later superheterodyne receivers from the 1930s on, the BFO signal was mixed with the constant intermediate frequency (IF) produced by the superheterodyne's detector. Therefore, the BFO could be a fixed frequency.

Continuous-wave vacuum tube transmitters replaced the other types of transmitter with the availability of power tubes after World War I because they were cheap. CW became the standard method of transmitting radiotelegraphy by the 20s, damped wave spark transmitters were banned by 1930 and CW continues to be used today. Even today most communications receivers produced for use in shortwave communication stations have BFOs.

== International regulation ==
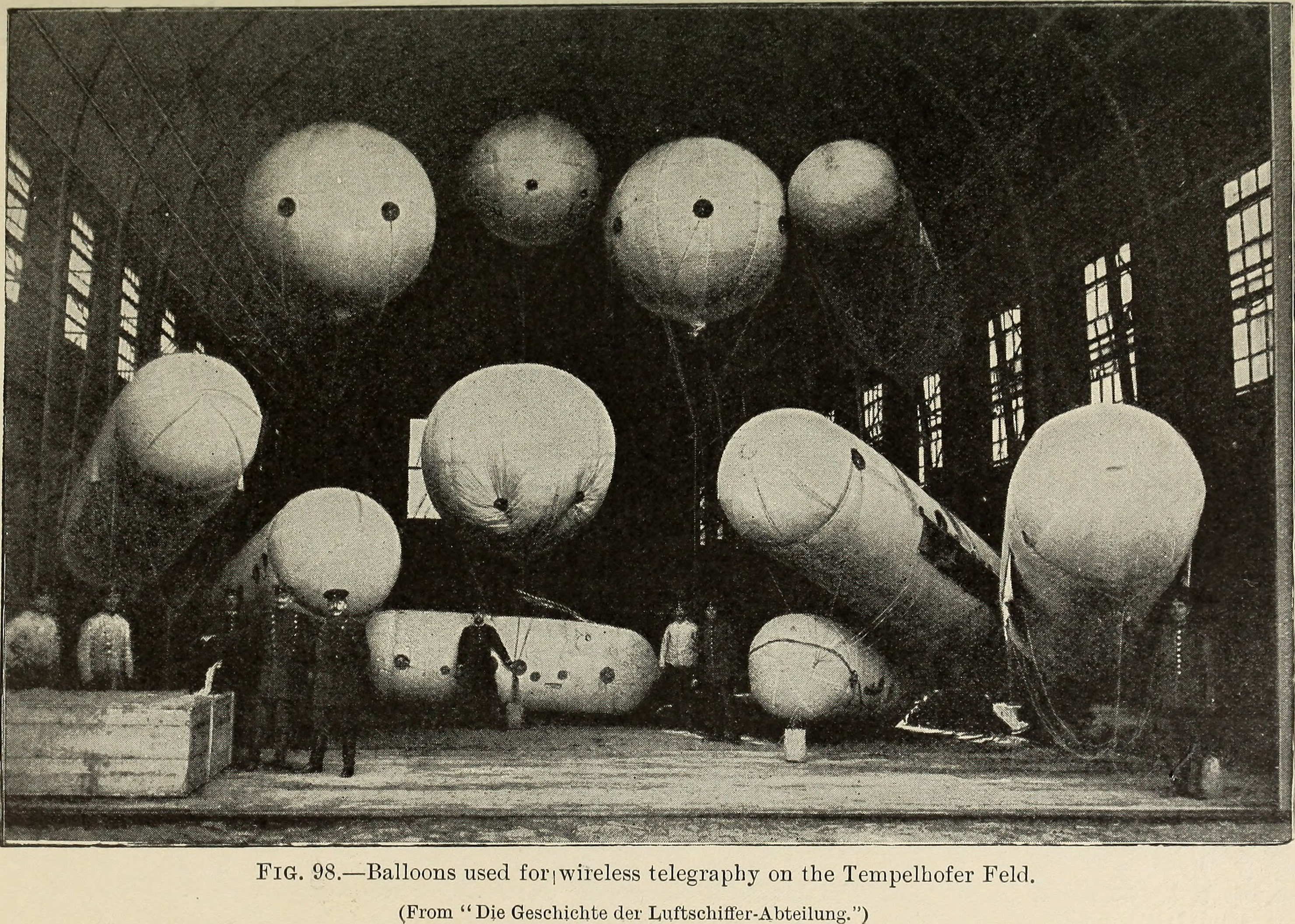
In World War I balloons were used as a quick way to raise wire antennas for military field radiotelegraph stations. Balloons at Tempelhofer Field, Germany, 1908.

The path toward international regulation of radiotelegraphy began after the Deutschland incident in 1902, when US-coast based stations with Marconi radios refused to communicate with ships that used other equipment. To solve the matter, the German Empire invited delegates from ten countries to Berlin for a Preliminary Conference on Wireless Telegraphy. This laid the groundwork for the first International Radiotelegraph Conference, signed in Berlin in 1906, which established an International Radiotelegraph Union as one of its outcomes. The Union was not an independent international organisation; the term referred to the group of countries that had adhered to the Radiotelegraph Conventions, in the tradition of other unions of the era such as the Postal Union and the Telegraph Union. Its administrative functions were handled by a dedicated radiotelegraph section within the International Telecommunication Union Bureau in Bern, Switzerland, originally focused on electric telegraph only. At the Madrid conference in 1932, the telegraph and radiotelegraph sections officially merged. This development that had been anticipated as early as the 1906 conference, when the French delegate noted that the two would undoubtedly unite in due course.

The international collaboration fostered by wireless telegraphy far exceeded the scope of the Radiotelegraph Conventions. The first International Time Conference in Paris in 1912 established a transnational network of wireless stations sending synchronized time beats across continents. Aviation and sea navigation became deeply dependent on the shared wireless infrastructure, creating new international interdependencies in transportation. Already in the 1910s, wireless also began to carry cultural content across borders: concerts and musical performances transmitted through the air reached listeners in multiple countries simultaneously, turning what had begun as a point-to-point communication technology into an early form of international broadcasting.

== Amateurs ==
From the end of the nineteenth century, many people experimented with wireless. Some were established professionals in their fields who wanted to apply wireless to their work, such as seismologist Albin Belar from Ljubljana, who used radio time signals to calibrate seismographs and founded the first modern seismological station in Europe, and Father Guido Alfani from Florence, who used wireless time signals from the Eiffel Tower to predict earthquakes. Many hobbyists also built stations from odds and ends in their backyards.

From the very beginning of World War I, the European governments had of course to restrict access to wireless. To ensure control of the transmission of messages within a given country, European governments, one by one, issued orders requesting that private stations be dismantled for the war effort, with the main reason to avoid possible disturbances and to prevent messages of national interest from being intercepted by private individuals. In the United States, private radiotelegraphy stations were prohibited in April 1917 when government entered the war. Although it affected several pioneers' work in this field, US radio amateurs generally progressed much more in experiments compared to their European colleagues who experienced the war and restrictions way earlier. Also, there were many amateurs that took risk of experimenting with the technology illegally. The Wireless World even launched a special section called ‘Wireless in the Courts’ in 1915 and 1916 based on court records about radio amateurs.

By the 1920s, there was a worldwide network of commercial and government radiotelegraphic stations, plus extensive use of radiotelegraphy by ships for both commercial purposes and passenger messages. The transmission of sound (radiotelephony) began to displace radiotelegraphy by the 1920s for many applications, making possible radio broadcasting. Wireless telegraphy continued to be used for private person-to-person business, governmental, and military communication, such as telegrams and diplomatic communications, and evolved into radioteletype networks. The ultimate implementation of wireless telegraphy was telex, using radio signals, which was developed in the 1930s and was for many years the only reliable form of communication between many distant countries. The most advanced standard, CCITT R.44, automated both routing and encoding of messages by short wave transmissions.

Today, due to more modern text transmission methods, Morse code radiotelegraphy for commercial use has become obsolete. On shipboard, the computer and satellite-linked GMDSS system have largely replaced Morse as a means of communication.

== Regulation ==
Continuous wave (CW) radiotelegraphy is regulated by the International Telecommunication Union (ITU) as emission type A1A.

The US Federal Communications Commission issues a lifetime commercial Radiotelegraph Operator License. This requires passing a simple written test on regulations, a more complex written exam on technology, and demonstrating Morse reception at 20 words per minute plain language and 16 wpm code groups. (Credit is given for amateur extra class licenses earned under the old 20 wpm requirement.)

== Gallery ==
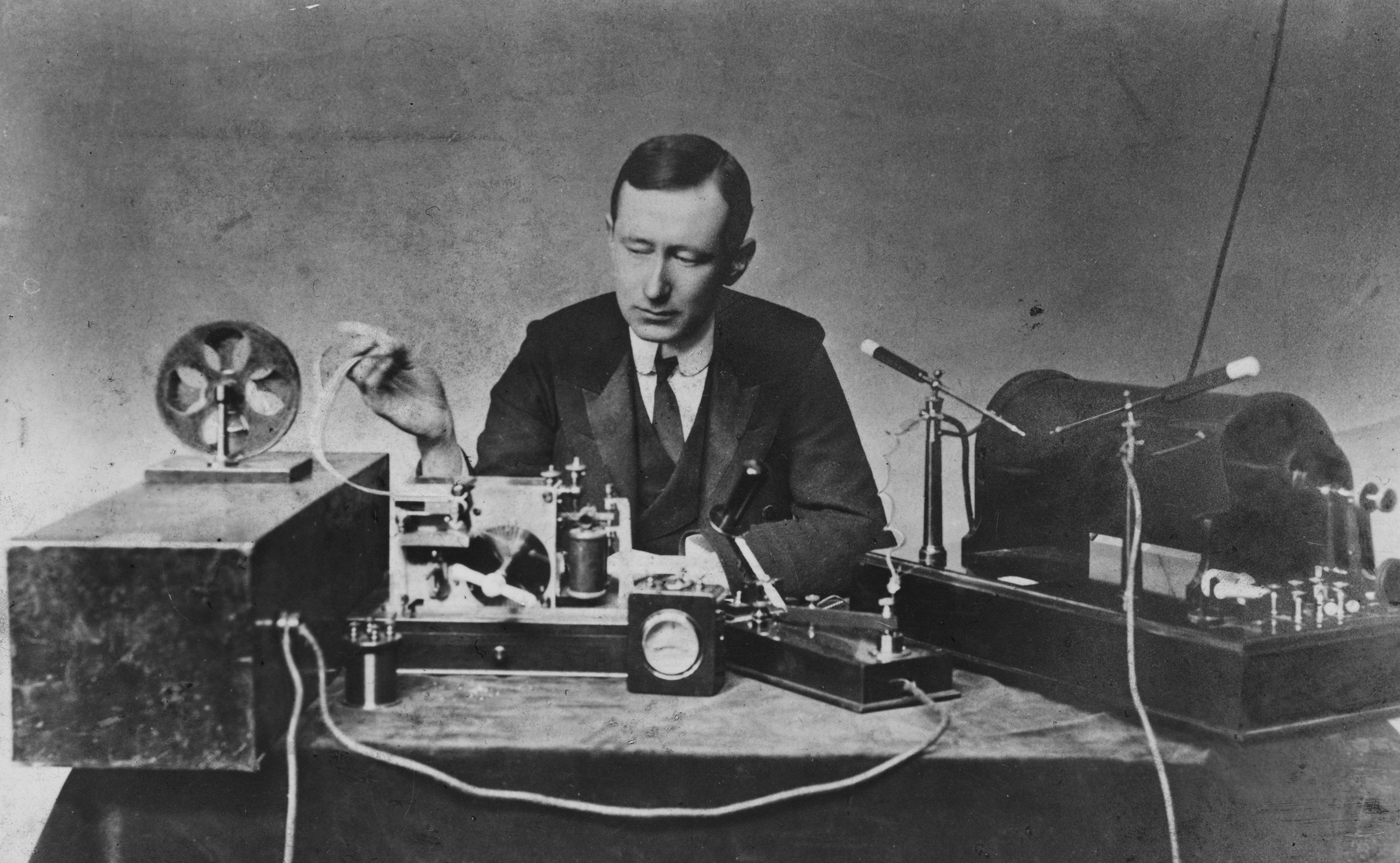
Guglielmo Marconi, generally credited as first to develop practical radio-based wireless telegraphy communication, in 1901 with one of his first transmitters (right) and receivers (left)

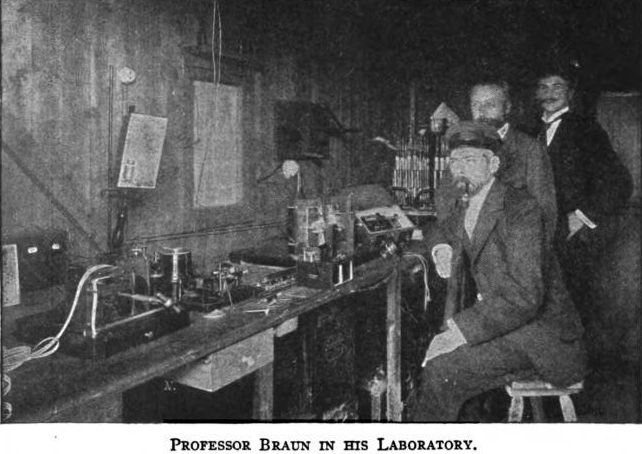
24 September 1900: Ferdinand Braun and telegraphists at a wireless station in Heligoland. His 2 circuit system made long range radio transmissions possible.

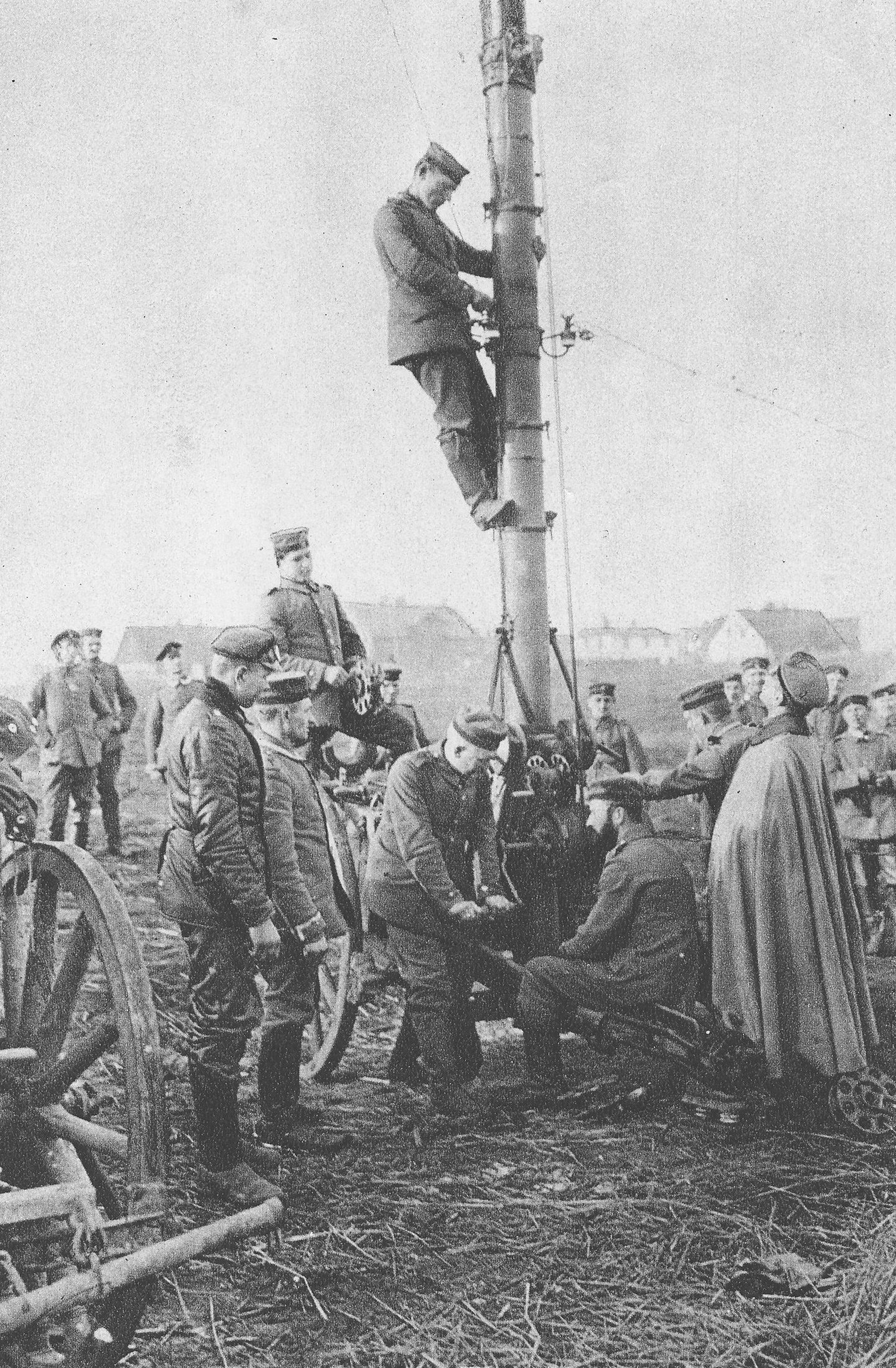
German troops erecting a wireless field telegraph station during World War I

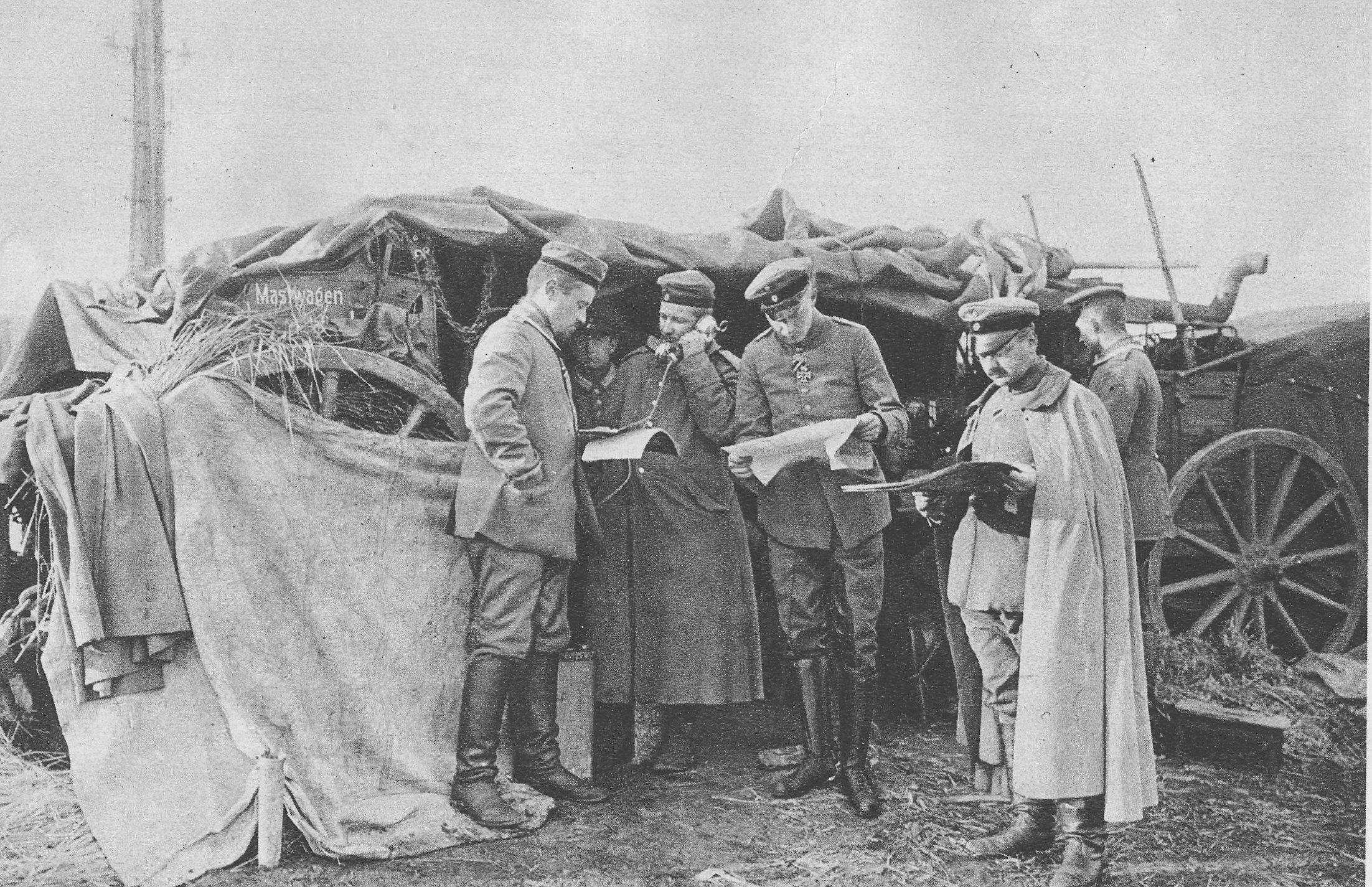
German officers and troops manning a wireless field telegraph station during World War I

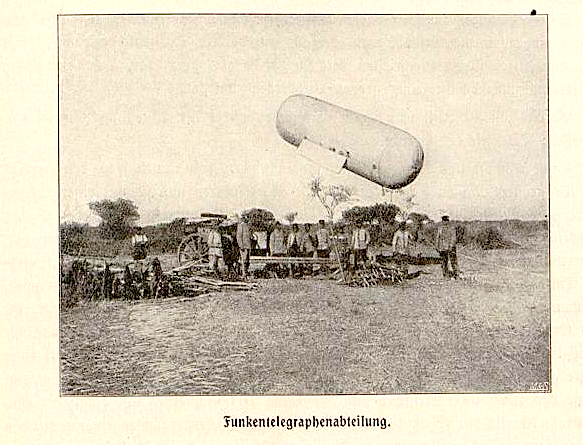
Mobile radio station in German South West Africa, using a hydrogen balloon to lift the antenna

== See also ==
- AT&T Corporation originally American Telephone and Telegraph Company
- Electrical telegraph
- Imperial Wireless Chain
- Radioteletype

== References and notes ==
=== General ===
- American Institute of Electrical Engineers. (1908). "Wireless Telephony – By R. A. Fessenden (Illustrated.)", Transactions of the American Institute of Electrical Engineers. New York: American Institute of Electrical Engineers.
