= Mari-Castle =

Historic house in Vermont, United States

- U.S. National Register of Historic Places
- U.S. Historic district
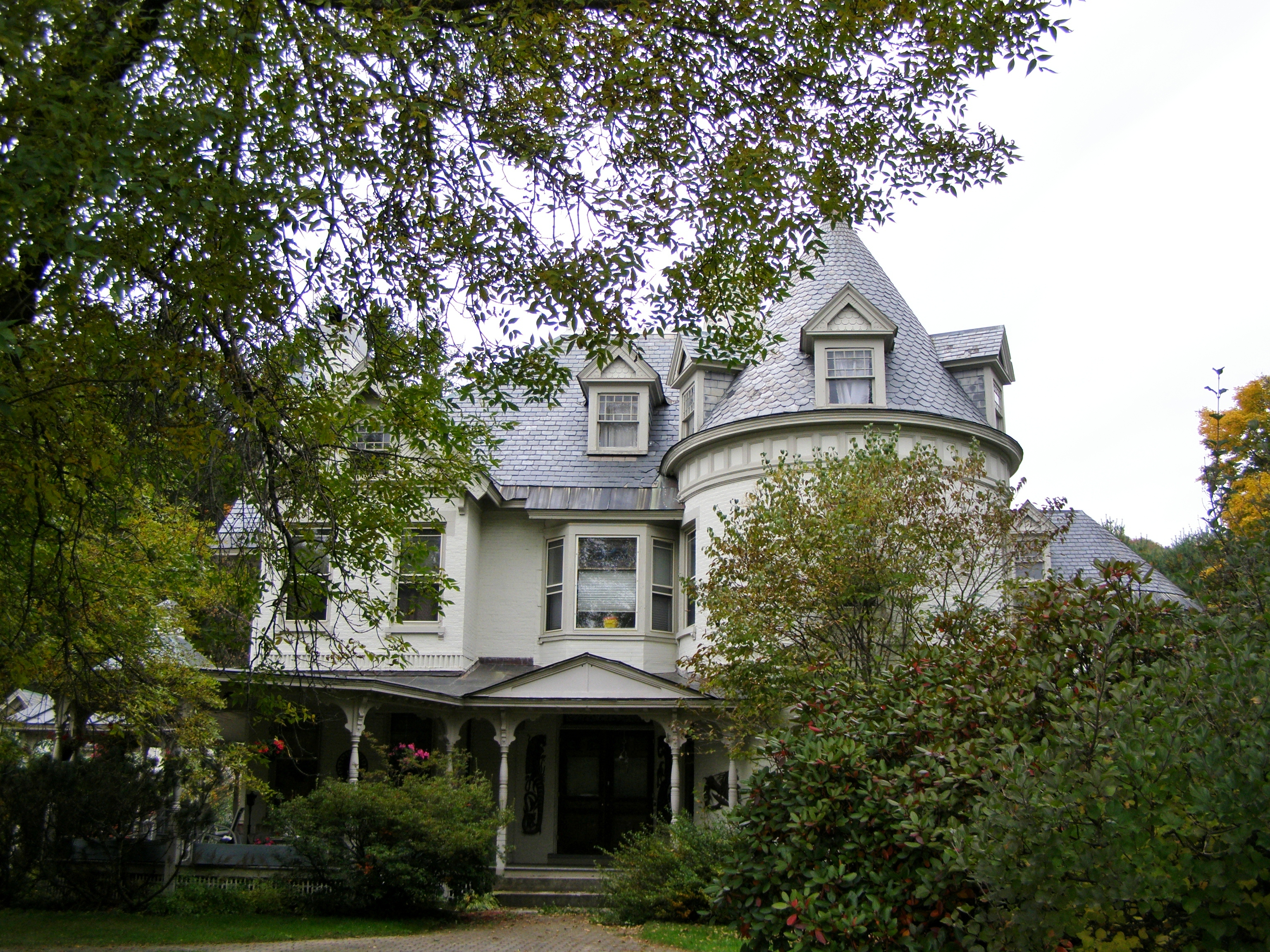

- Location within Vermont Location within the United States
- Location: 41-43 S. Main St., Randolph, Vermont
- Coordinates: 43°55′3″N 72°40′6″W
- Area: 11.9 acres (4.8 ha)
- Built: 1886; 1894-95
- Architect: George Edward Harding & Gooch (1894-95)
- Architectural style: Queen Anne, Chateauesque
- NRHP reference No.: 90000796
- Added to NRHP: May 24, 1990

Mari-Castle is a historic summer estate at 41-43 South Main Street in Randolph, Vermont. Built in 1886 for Albert Brown Chandler, it was the town's finest summer house of the period, and was named for Chandler's wife Marilla. Chandler, president of the nationwide Postal Telegraph Company, was a Randolph native, who funded construction of the Chandler Music Hall. His estate, now used primarily for professional offices, was listed on the National Register of Historic Places in 1990.

== Description and history ==
Mari-Castle stands on the west side of South Main Street, south of Randolph's commercial business district, and now just northwest of Gifford Memorial Hospital. The property now consists of about 12 acres (4.9 ha) (reduced from a much larger original property), on which stand four buildings. The main house is an 1886 Queen Anne Victorian, which was extensively redesigned in 1894–95 to have a more Chateauesque appearance. Behind the house stand a carriage house and barn, while to its left (south) stands a 20th-century chapel. The original main drive includes a rustic stone bridge across a narrow ravine, which was built about 1895.

Albert Brown Chandler was born in Randolph, and had an early career as a telegraph operator for Western Union. He achieved public prominence for his work as the telegraph operator in the United States War Department during the American Civil War. He rose to become president of the Atlantic and Pacific Telegraph Company, and then the Postal Telegraph Company, which he put on a sound financial footing, enabling it to successfully compete with Western Union until the two companies merged in the 1940s. Chandler in 1886 built a Queen Anne Victorian on this property as a summer house for his family. In 1894-95 it was enlarged to its present configuration to a design by George Edward Harding & Gooch, a New York City architectural firm which had designed the Postal Telegraph Building in New York's Tribeca neighborhood for Chandler. The property was sold out of the family after Chandler died, and has been used primarily for professional office space since then. The main building is currently a privately owned residence. The carriage house, and chapel are currently privately owned health and wellness facilities. Unsympathetic alterations made to the property were reversed in the 1980s.

== See also ==
- National Register of Historic Places listings in Orange County, Vermont
