= George Edward Harding =

American architect

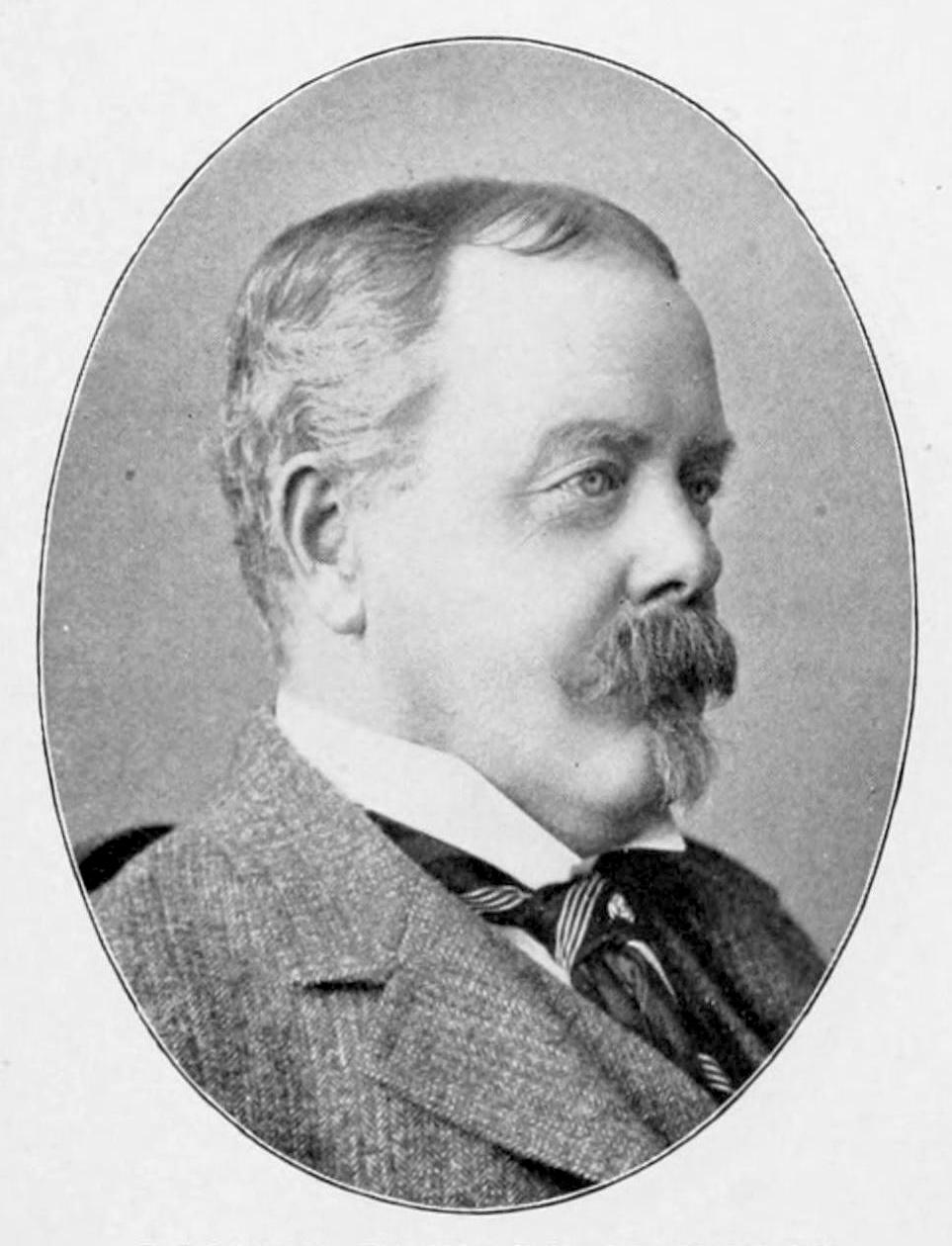
- George Edward Harding, circa 1899
- Born: 1843; Bath, Maine
- Died: 1907 (aged 63–64); Passaic, New Jersey
- Occupation: Architect

George Edward Harding (1843–1907) was an American architect in practice in New York City. In association with his partner William Tyson Gooch, he is best known as designer of several early skyscrapers in New York.

== Life and career ==
George Edward Harding was born in Bath, Maine in 1843. He was educated as an engineer at Columbia University.

In 1872 Harding began practice as an associate of architect Arthur Gilman. Harding left in 1880 to establish his own office. He practiced alone until circa 1886, when he formed a short-lived partnership with Frederick P. Dinkelberg. This was dissolved in January, 1888. In 1889 he became associated with William Tyson Gooch, (Note: William Tyson Gooch was born in 1855 in England and was educated there and in France. He came to New York in 1882, joining the office of Charles C. Haight, with whom he remained until joining Harding. Gooch died in 1937.) practicing as George Edward Harding & Company. They formed a partnership in 1890, which was known as George Edward Harding & Gooch.

In 1902 the partnership was dissolved. Harding continued to practice independently for several years but was obliged to retire several years before his death due to his declining health. Harding died in 1907 in Passaic, New Jersey.

== Legacy ==
Harding is notable as the designer of several of the early skyscrapers in New York City, projects probably obtained through his training as an engineer. He was also the designer of a number of cottages at Newport and elsewhere. At least one of his buildings has been listed on the United States National Register of Historic Places, and others have been designated New York City Landmarks.

== Architectural works ==
- Remodeling of and additions to the Brunswick Hotel, New York, New York (1881, demolished 1906)
- "Inchiquin" for John O'Brien, Newport, Rhode Island (1886)
- "Oak View" for William H. Osgood, Newport, Rhode Island (1887)
- Patten Free Library, Bath, Maine (1889–90)
- Holland House, New York, New York (1890–92)
- "Pansy Cottage" for William Storrs Wells, Newport, Rhode Island (1890, burned 1900)
- Postal Telegraph Company Building, (Note: Annexed to the Home Life Building since 1947.) New York, New York (1892–94)
- House for Emil Thiele, (Note: 310 Riverside Drive.) New York, New York (1893, demolished)
- Remodeling of "Mari-Castle" for Albert Brown Chandler, Randolph, Vermont (1894–95, NRHP 1990)
- Gerken Building, New York, New York (1895)
- Commercial Cable Company Building, New York, New York (1896–97, demolished)
- Dun Building, New York, New York (1896, demolished)
- Mausoleum for John William Mackay, Green-Wood Cemetery, Brooklyn, New York (1896)
- House for Albert H. Shaw, Bath, Maine (1899-1900, demolished)
- St. Peter R. C. Church, Staten Island, New York (1900–03)

== Gallery of architectural works ==
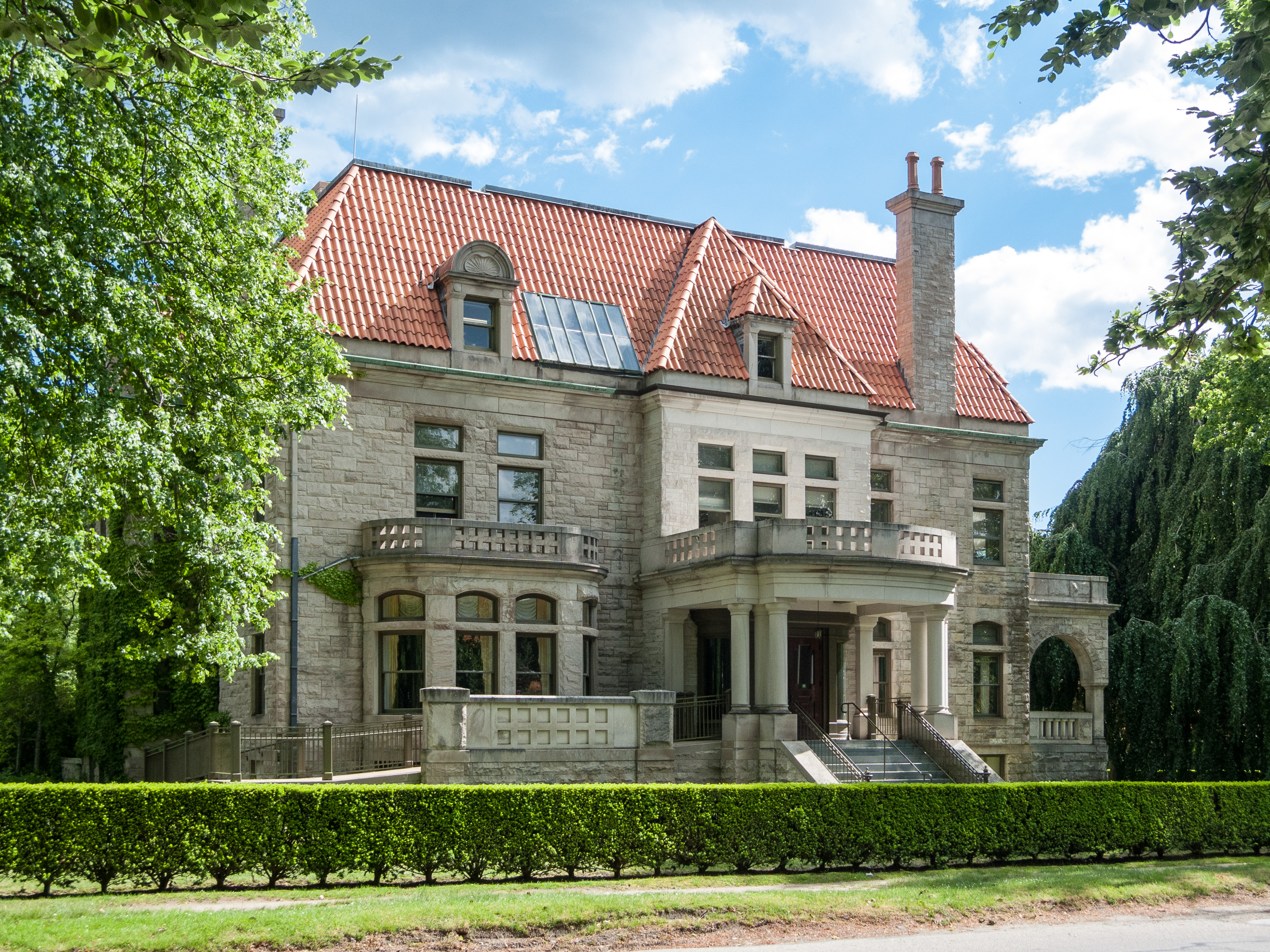
Oak View, Newport, Rhode Island, 1887.

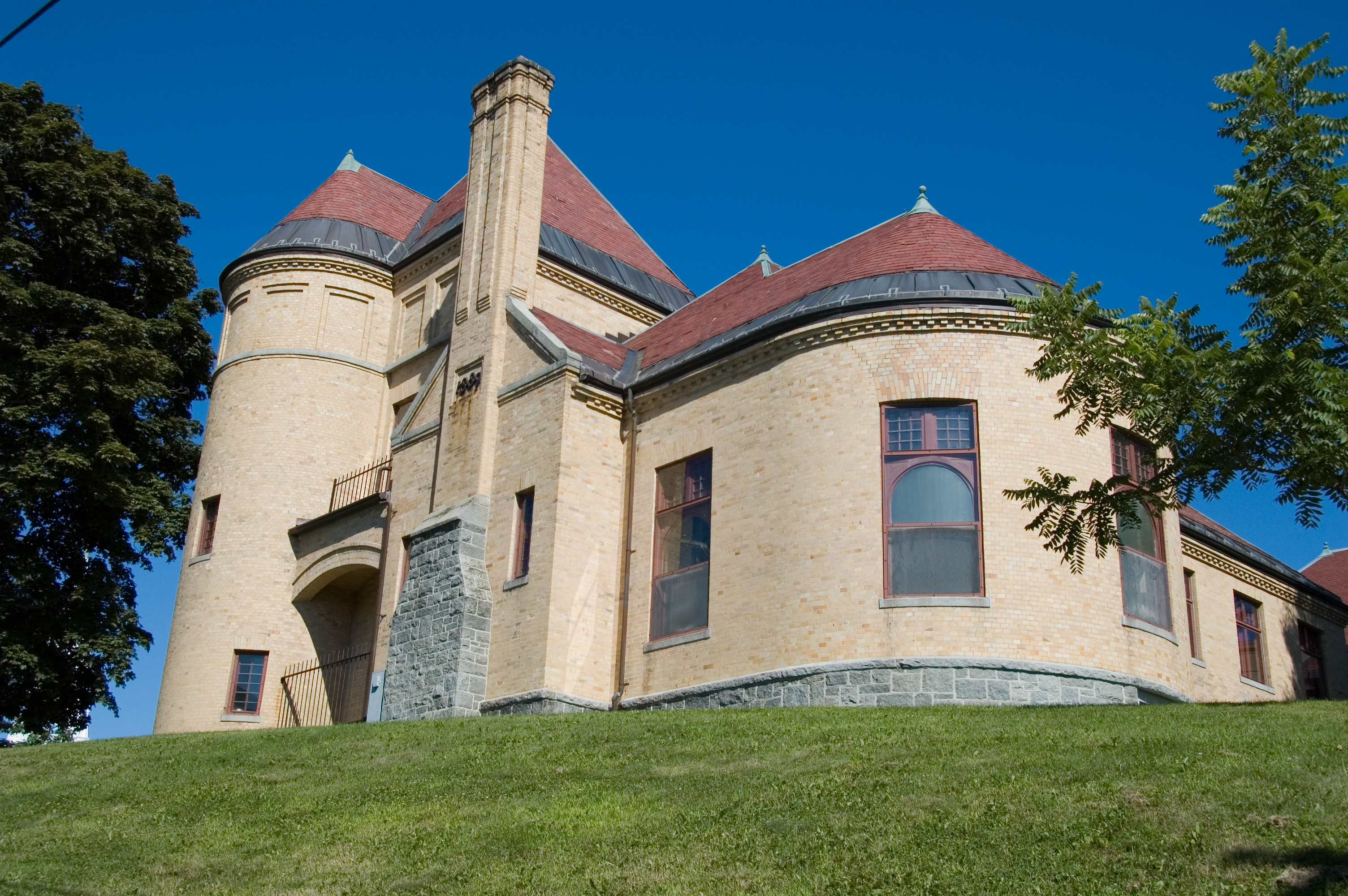
Patten Free Library, Bath, Maine, 1889-90.

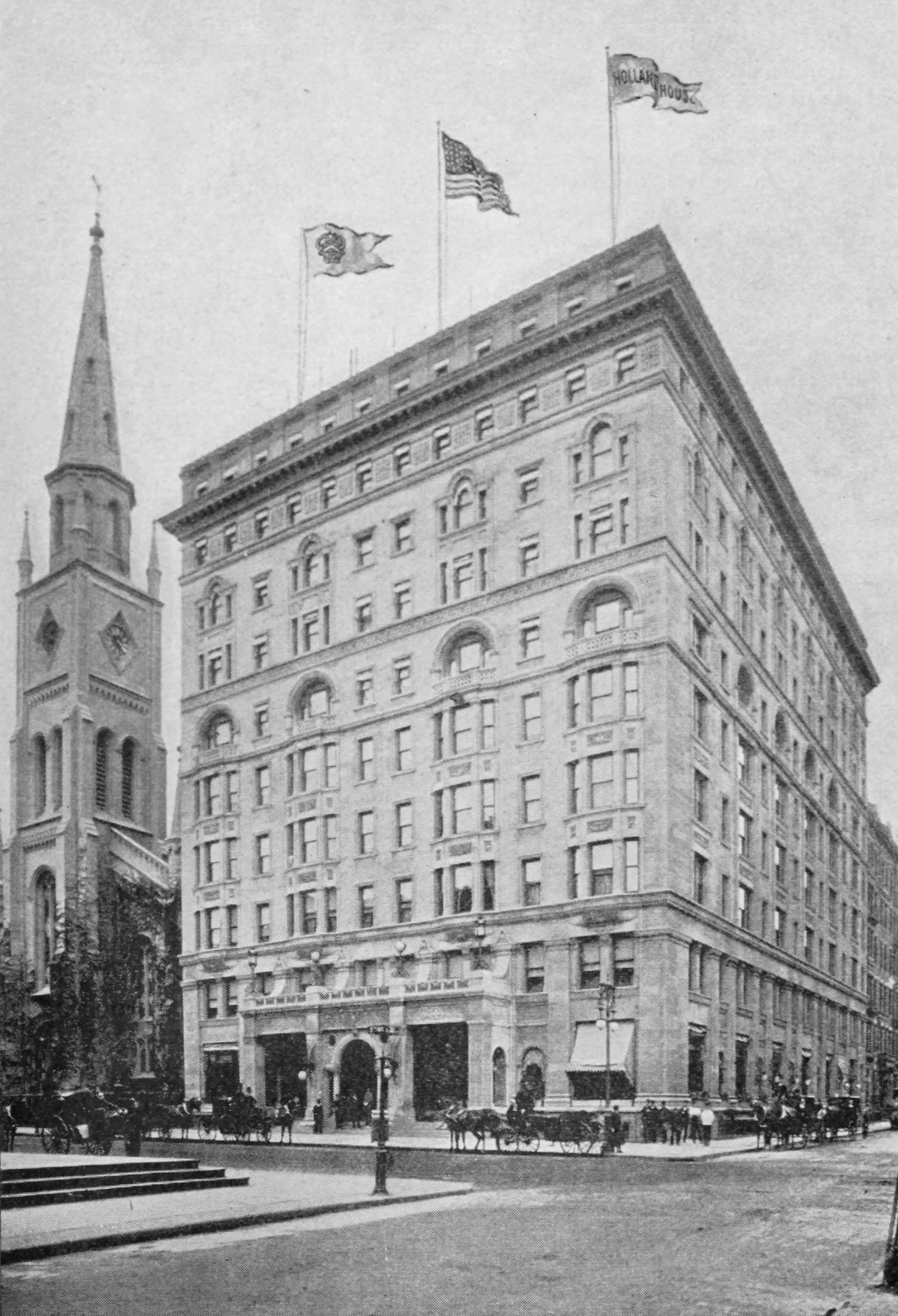
Holland House, New York, New York, 1890-92.

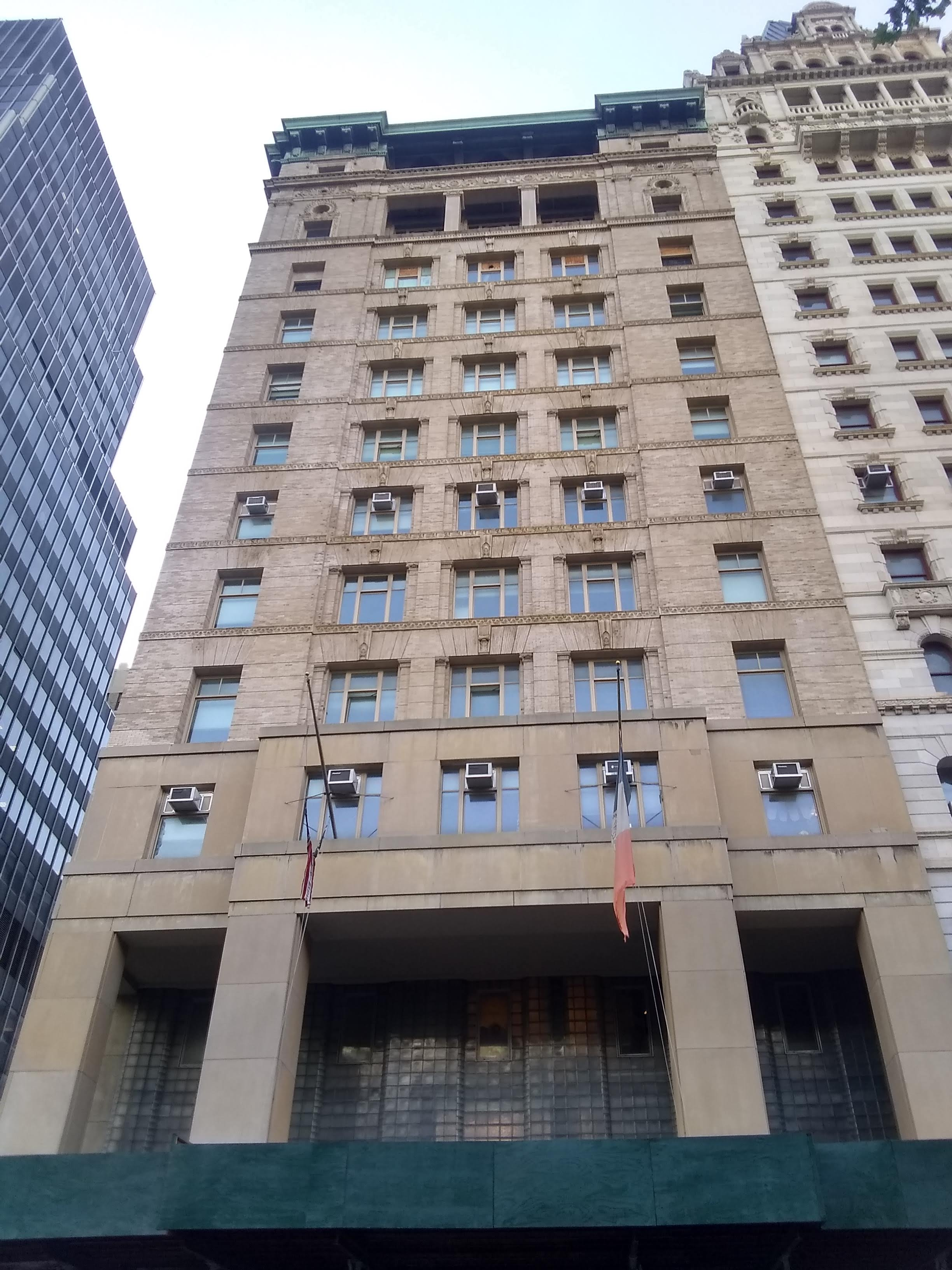
Postal Telegraph Company Building, New York, New York, 1892-94.

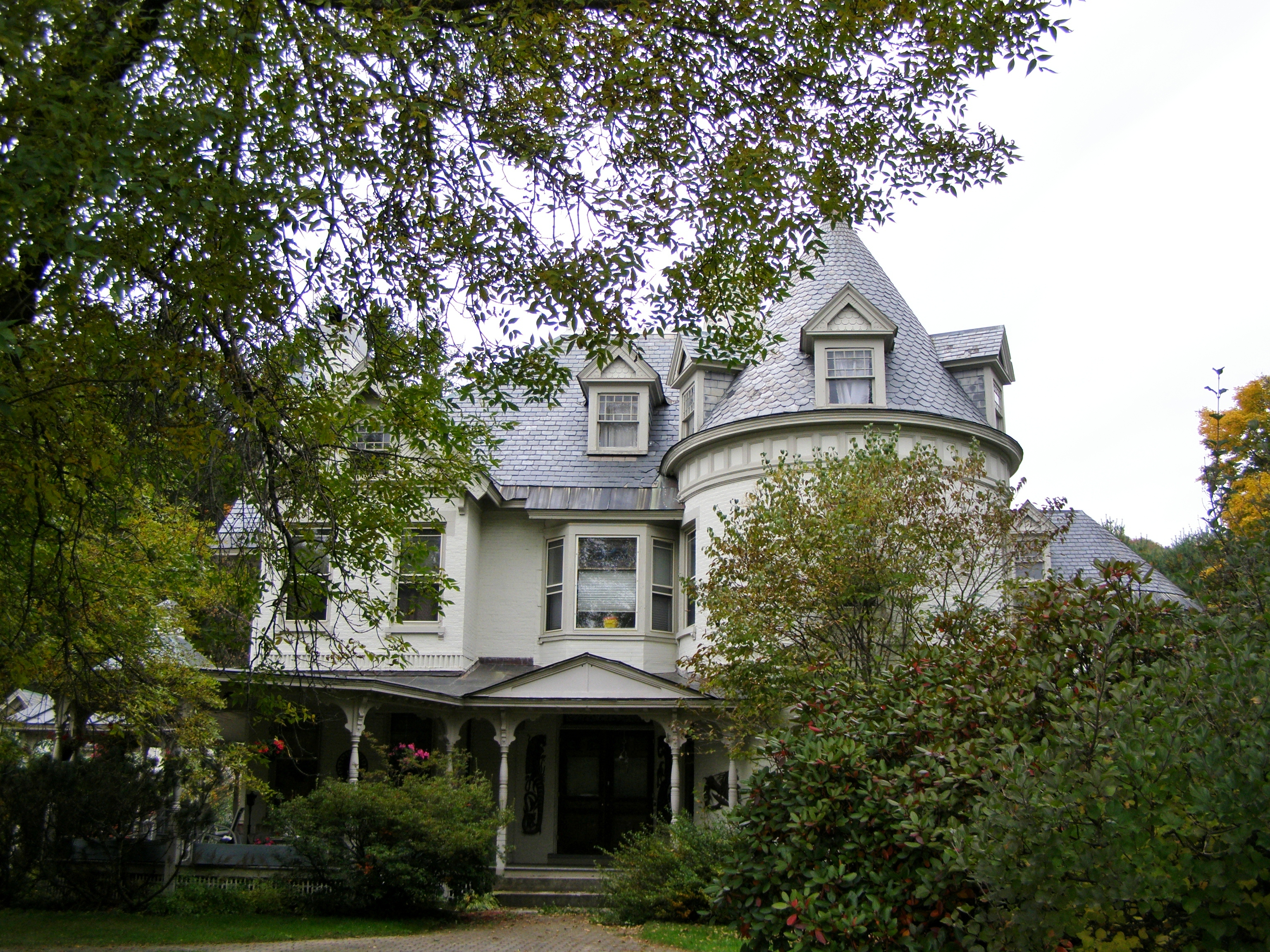
Mari-Castle, Randolph, Vermont, 1894-95.

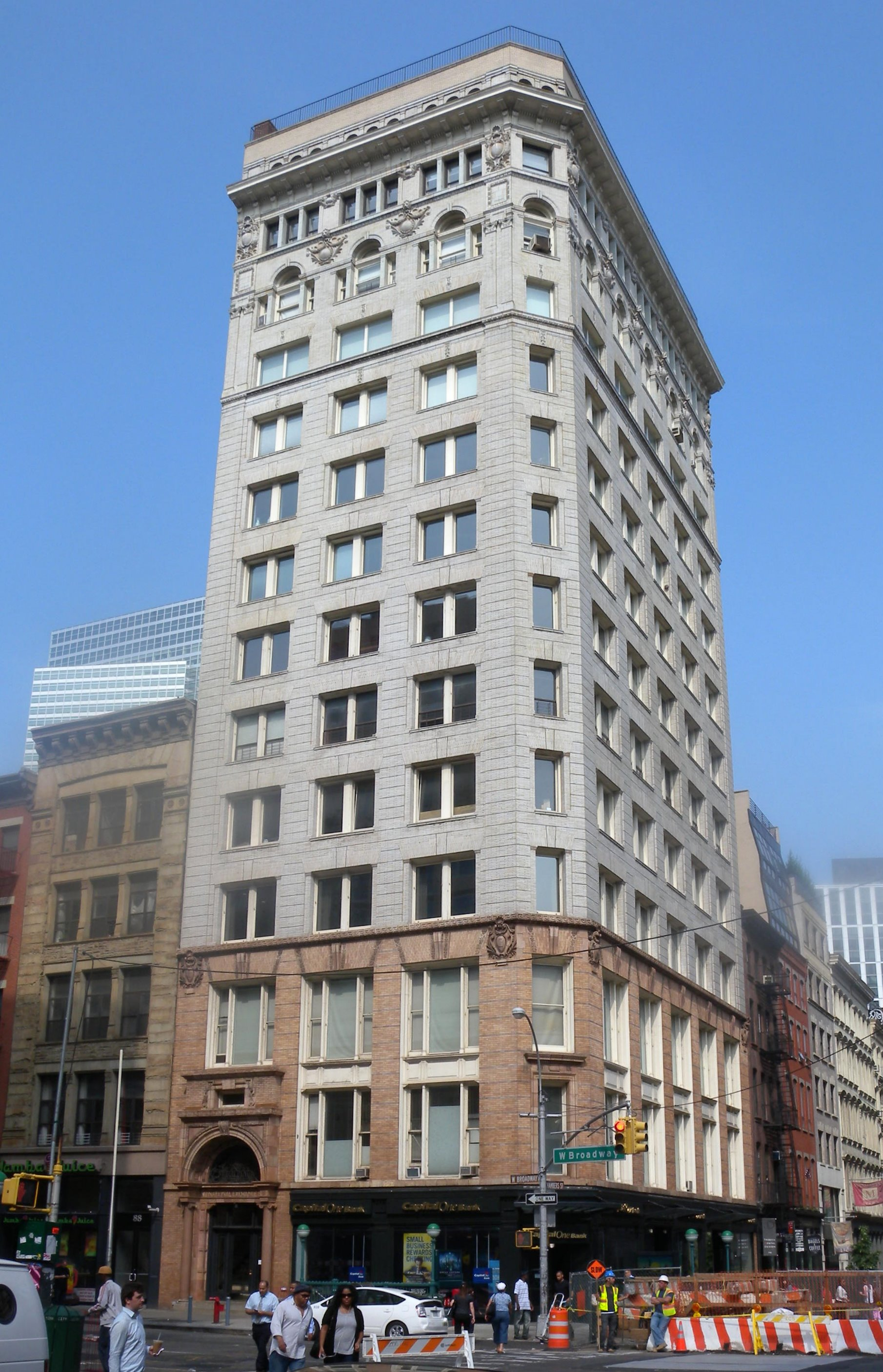
Gerken Building, New York, New York, 1895.

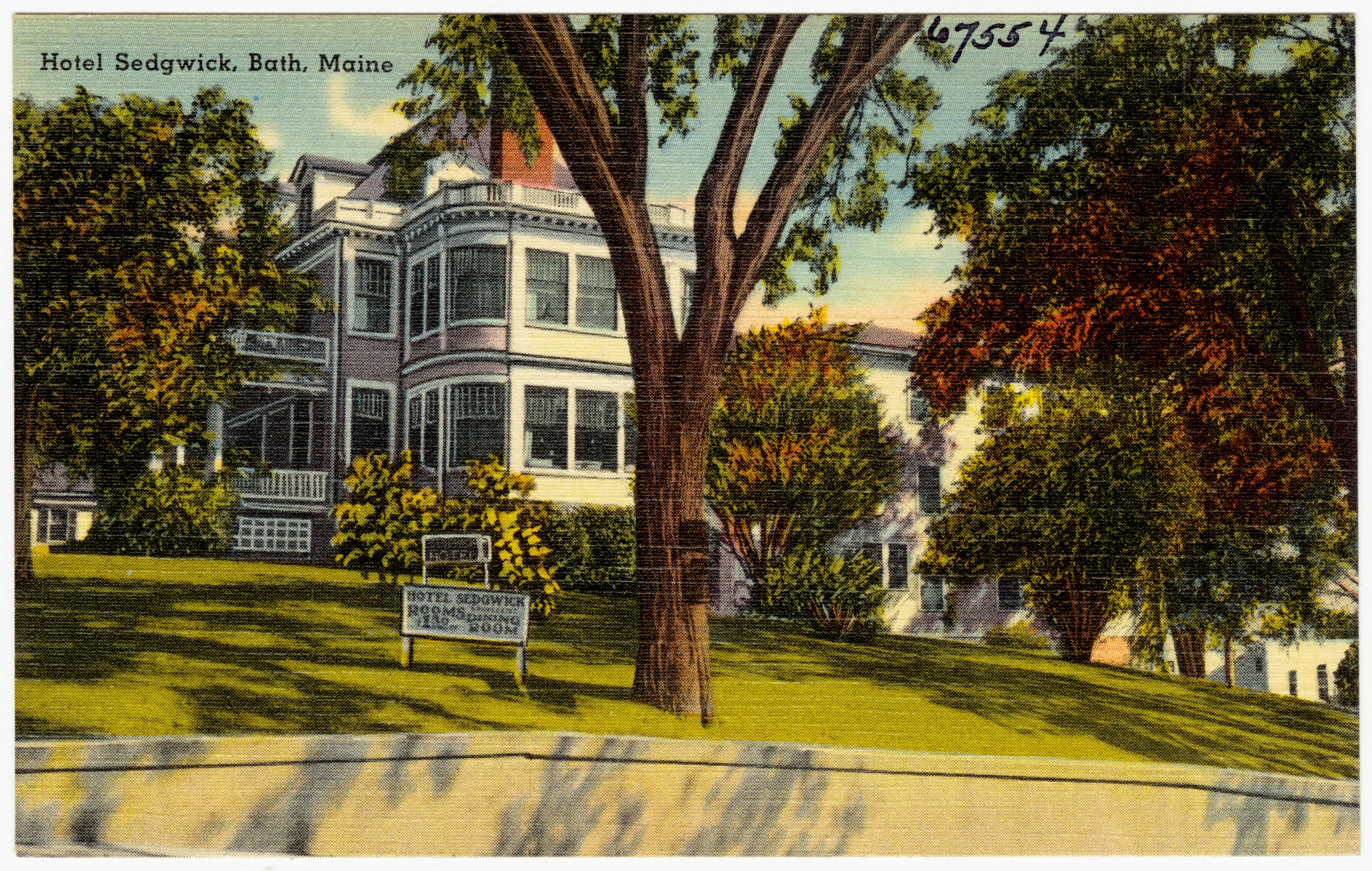
House for Albert H. Shaw, Bath, Maine, 1899-1900.

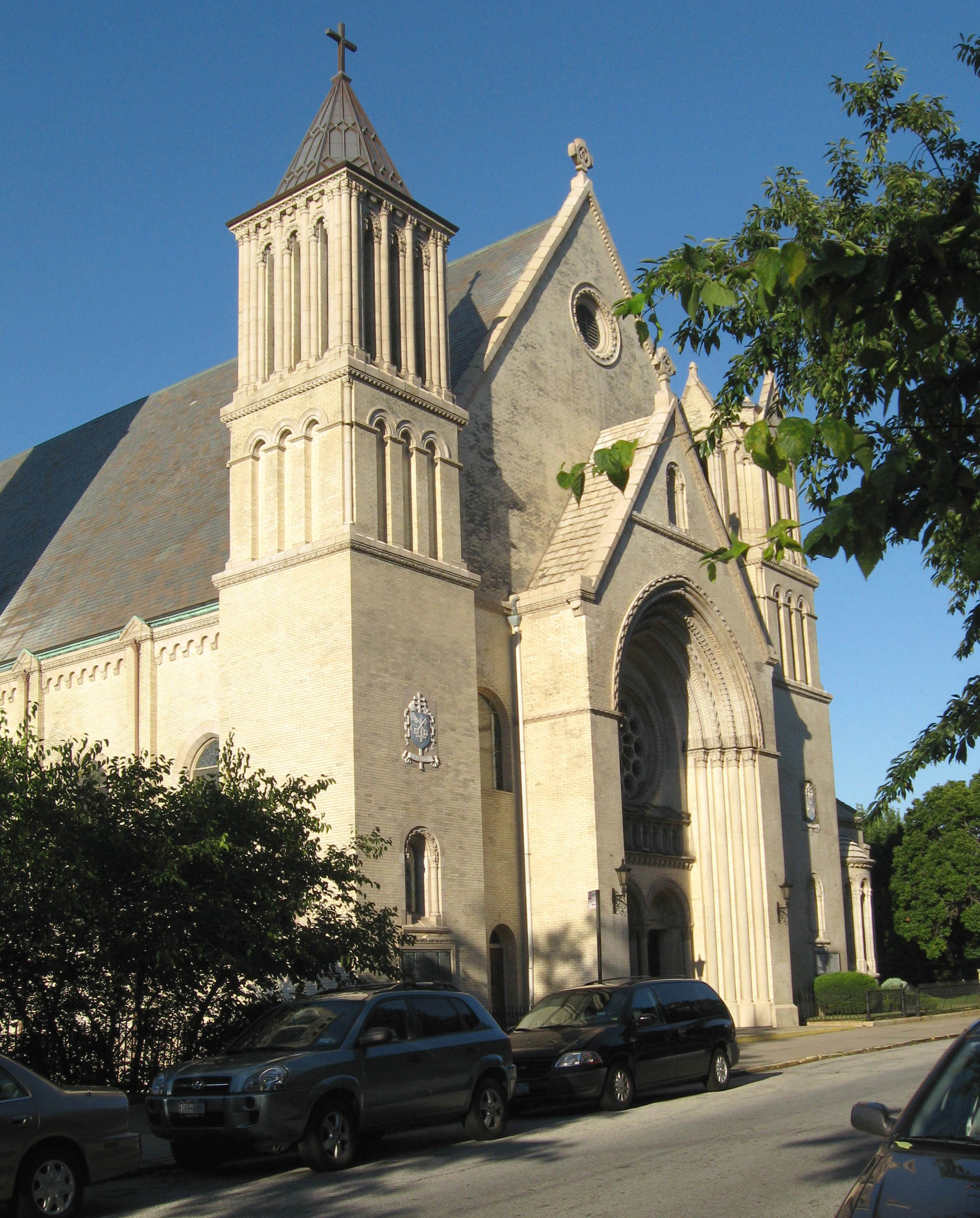
St. Peter R. C. Church, Staten Island, New York, 1900-03.

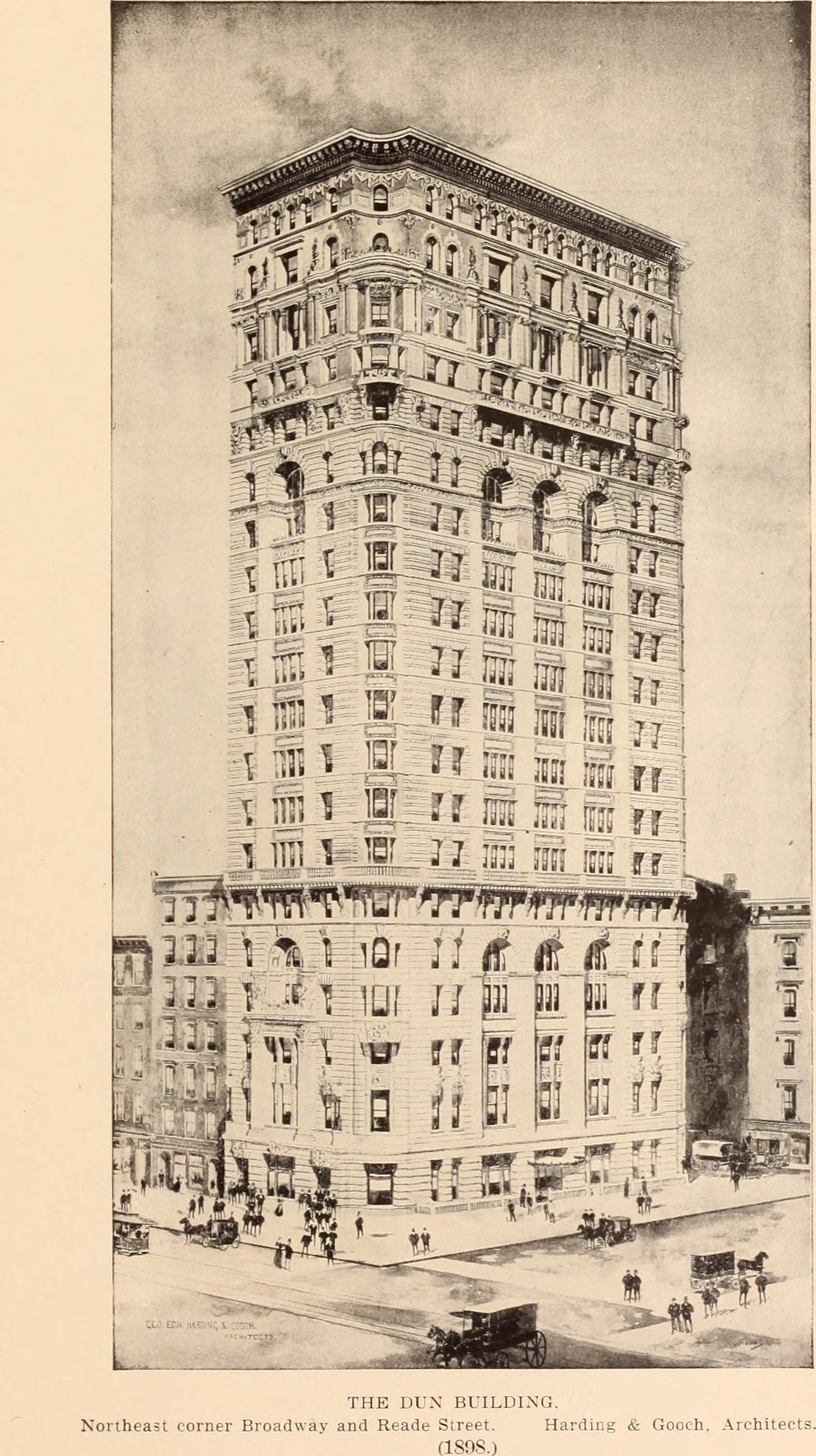
Dun Building, New York, New York, 1898.
