= Commercial Cable Company Building =

Building in Manhattan, New York (1897–1954)

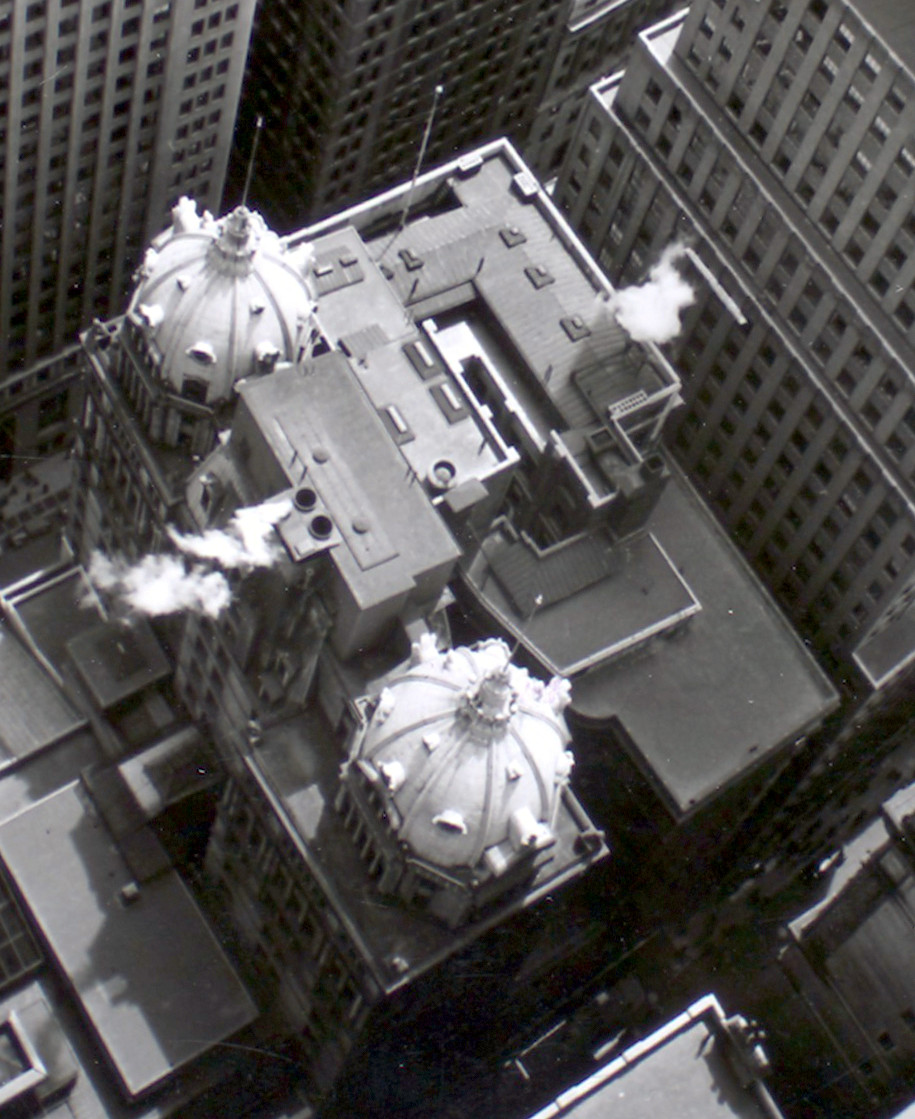
- View of the building's roof
- Interactive map of the Commercial Cable Company Building area

General information
- Status: Demolished
- Architectural style: Neoclassical architecture
- Location: New York City
- Coordinates: 40°42′24″N 74°0′41″W
- Construction started: 1896
- Construction stopped: 1897
- Demolished: 1954

Design and construction
- Architect: Harding & Gooch

The Commercial Cable Company Building was an early skyscraper at 20–24 Broad Street Extension in Manhattan, New York City. Built for the Commercial Cable Company, it started construction in 1896 and was completed in 1897. It was designed by Harding & Gooch. Its height was 92.7 m (304 ft) and it was 22 stories tall. The building, like many of its contemporaries, was built in a historicist style, richly decorated. Two domes were designed on top.

The building adjoined the New York Stock Exchange. The Exchange leased the western portions of the first three floors in 1926, which were remodeled to include an trading floor.

It stood for half a century and was demolished in 1954. A 27-story modern office building was built in its place.
