= Holland House (New York City) =

Former hotel in Manhattan, New York

Coordinates: 40.7459°N 73.9868°W

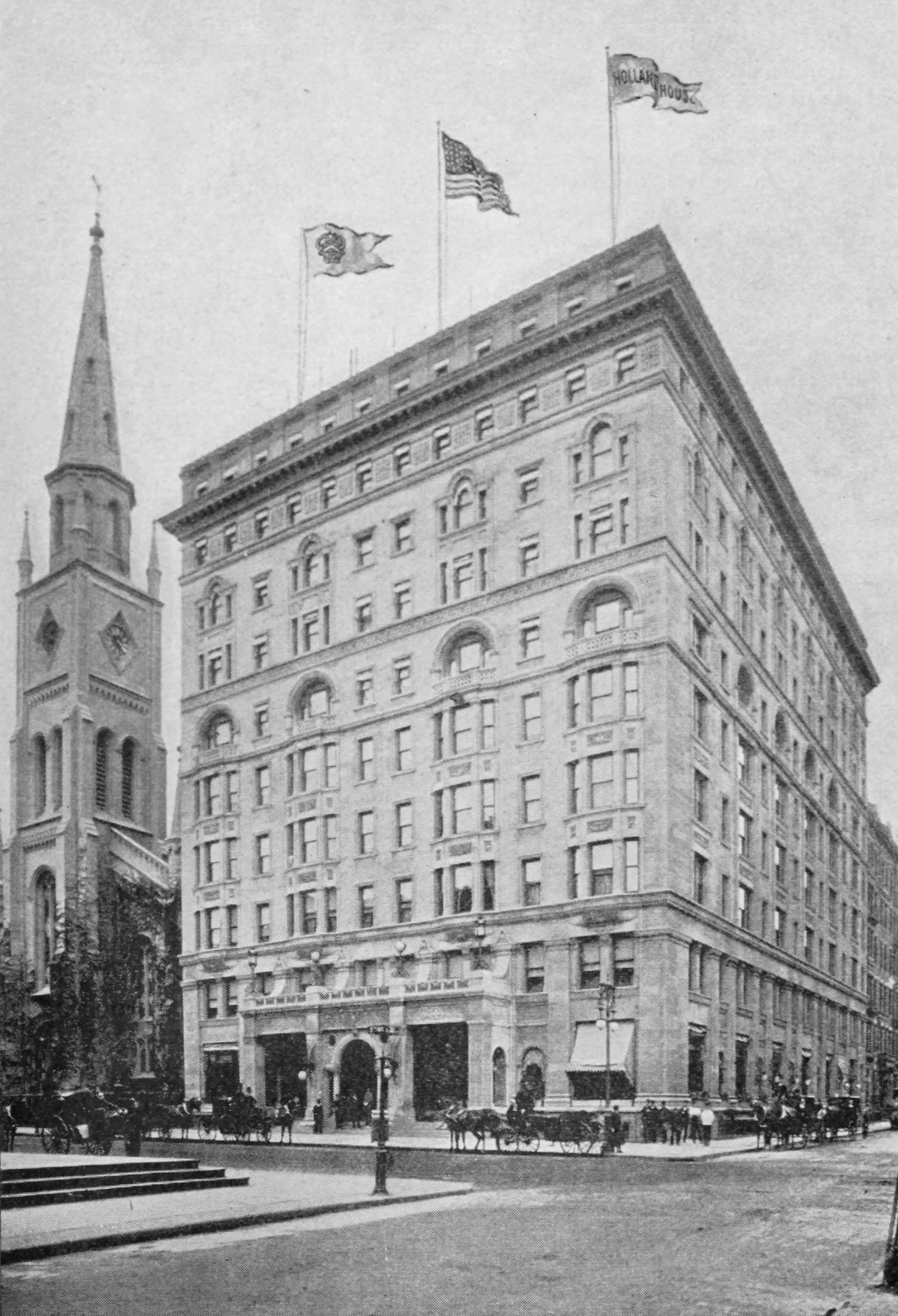
- Interactive map of the Holland House (New York City) area

General information
- Architectural style: Renaissance Revival architecture
- Location: Manhattan, New York City
- Opened: 1892

Design and construction
- Architect: George Edward Harding & Gooch

Holland House was a New York City hotel located at 274–276 Fifth Avenue at the southwest corner of 30th Street in NoMad, Manhattan, New York City, with a frontage of 250 feet (76 m) on Fifth Avenue. The architects and designers were George Edward Harding & Gooch. A mercantile building by the 1920s, in the present day, it is a loft building.

The Holland House opened in 1892. It was a large building of Indiana limestone, 100 by 150 feet (30 m × 46 m). Special interest was attached to it as it was a careful reproduction of Holland House of London. It contained the coat-of-arms of Henry Rich, the first Earl of Holland, with the decorations and historic features of the Kensington mansion. The house was one of the architectural features of Fifth Avenue. The facade, which had little decoration, was broken with a portico 50 feet (15 m) in length, supported upon four columns, four rows of bay windows, and other windows set in embrasures and arches. Two features of the interior were the large dining-room and a long promenade in the second story. The house was ten stories high, and had 350 rooms.

== Architecture and fittings ==
The style was a modification of the Italian Renaissance; and the material of the walls was a gray Indiana limestone. The portico was decorated with stone carvings. The main staircase and corridors were carved in Siena marble and bronze. A London magazine characterized it as the handsomest staircase of its kind in America. The hotel office, in Italian Renaissance, and encased in Siena marble, contained a large safe, in which are a number of steel safe-deposit boxes for the use of the guests. On the main floor was the restaurant, with a seating capacity of 300 persons. On the same floor was the cafe, with its furnishings in the manner of Holland House in London with screens of glass, marble and bronze in tones of gray and pale yellow. The buffet, in a soft yellow and golden brown, had high wainscots of panelled wood. The foyer, on the parlor floor, was lit by four immense torchères, bearing electric lights. The ladies' reading-room, with pale satin and plush hangings, contained files of newspapers and writing-desks. The drawing room was in the style of Louis XVI., with its walls covered with salmon-tinted satin damask, embroidered portieres, furniture in the Adams and Chippendale styles, and fawn-colored Axminster carpet. The Gilt Room was a reproduction of the Gilt Room in London's Holland House, in Elizabethan architecture, with carved wainscotting, heraldic devices, gold-crown ornaments, antique furniture in natural cherry and gold, fire-places, English parquet floors, Flemish chandeliers, and plush curtains embroidered with fleur-de-lys.

One of the bridal suites was in Louis XV style, with satin brocade hangings and furniture, and curtains of Brussels point lace; and the other was in the style of the First Empire, with upholstering of French tapestry, and curtains of point lace. Each of the 350 rooms was furnished and decorated in a distinctive style. A special feature of each was an electric indicator by which a guest, without waiting for a bell-boy, could signal direct to the office for any of 140 various articles. This indicator, known as the Herzog Teleseme, was one of the conveniences of Holland House, serving as a signalling system. It consisted of a dial sunk into the wall, and connected by electricity with the office; upon this dial were printed 140 articles at times needed by travellers, and the guest moved the pointer until it pointed at the desired object, and then pressed an electric button, whereupon the clerk in the office sent up the desired newspaper, or bottle, or food, or any other needed thing. The rooms had brass bedsteads, red-birch woodwork, Wilton carpets, and modern furniture. Holland House was fire-proof, and contained sanitary plumbing. Its walls and floor-arches were of porous terra cotta, a nonconductor of heat, cold or noise. The heating pipes are encased in asbestos.

== Holland House Bouquets ==
In 1892, the proprietors of the Holland House sought an injunction against a cigar manufacturer to prohibit him from selling a certain brand of cigar which he called "Holland House Bouquets". At the time the manufacturer registered the "Holland House Bouquets", the hotel proprietors had not opened the Holland House for business, but at that time, the building was in process of construction, and it was well known in the City of New York as Holland House. The court enjoined the cigar manufacturer from using the aforesaid term, even though there was no proof of actual or special damage.

== Bibliography ==
- Gehring Publishing Company (1922). New York Hotel Review (Public domain ed.). Gehring Publishing Company.
- King, Moses (1892). King's Handbook of New York City: An Outline History and Description of the American Metropolis (Public domain ed.). Moses King.
- King, Moses (1893). Kings Handbook of New York City (Public domain ed.). Moses King. p. 224.
- White, Norval; Willensky, Elliot; Leadon, Fran (2010). AIA Guide to New York City (5th ed.). New York: Oxford University Press. ISBN 978-0-19538-386-7.
