= Patten Free Library =

Library in Bath, Maine

Coordinates: 43.915°N 69.8153°W

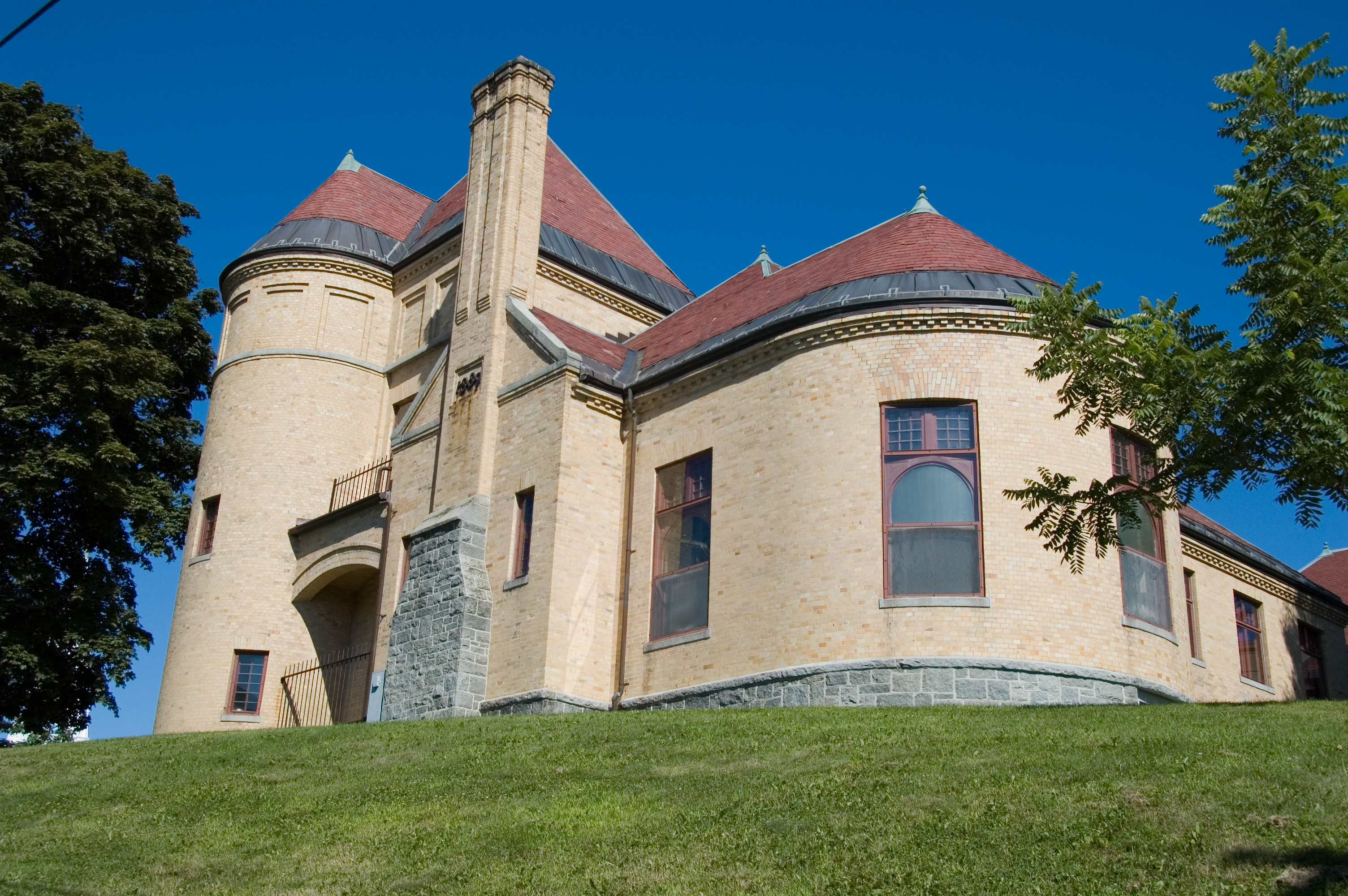
- Location: Bath, Maine, United States
- Type: Public
- Established: 1847

Collection
- Size: 56,000

Access and use
- Circulation: 150,000
- Population served: 17,148

Other information
- Budget: $655,496
- Director: Lesley Dolinger
- Employees: 24
- Website: www.patten.lib.me.us

The Patten Free Library is a public library in Bath, Maine, United States. It also serves the communities of Arrowsic, Georgetown, West Bath, and Woolwich.

The Patten Library Association was founded in 1847. In 1887, Galen C. Moses donated $10,000 to fund a building for the library. The original building was designed by George Edward Harding, and was finished in 1890. New wings were built in 1961 and 1998.
