= Commercial Cable Company =

American telegraphy business

- Founded: 1884; 142 years ago in New York, United States

The Commercial Cable Company was founded in New York in 1884 by John William Mackay and James Gordon Bennett, Jr.

Their motivation was to break the then virtual monopoly of Jay Gould on transatlantic telegraphy and bring down prices (particularly for Bennett's newspaper empire). Their most famous ship was the CS Mackay-Bennett, named after the founders.

The technology was well established by this time, and they were able to lay cables from Waterville in Ireland to Canso, Nova Scotia, without the major technical problems of the first Transatlantic telegraph cable. Onward connections to New York City and beyond were initially overland and later submarine. Connections from Waterville to Weston-super-Mare in England and Le Havre in France were soon established by the submarine route after initial use of landlines from Waterville onward to mainland Britain. Commercial Cable also had a relationship with the German Atlantic submarine cable system.

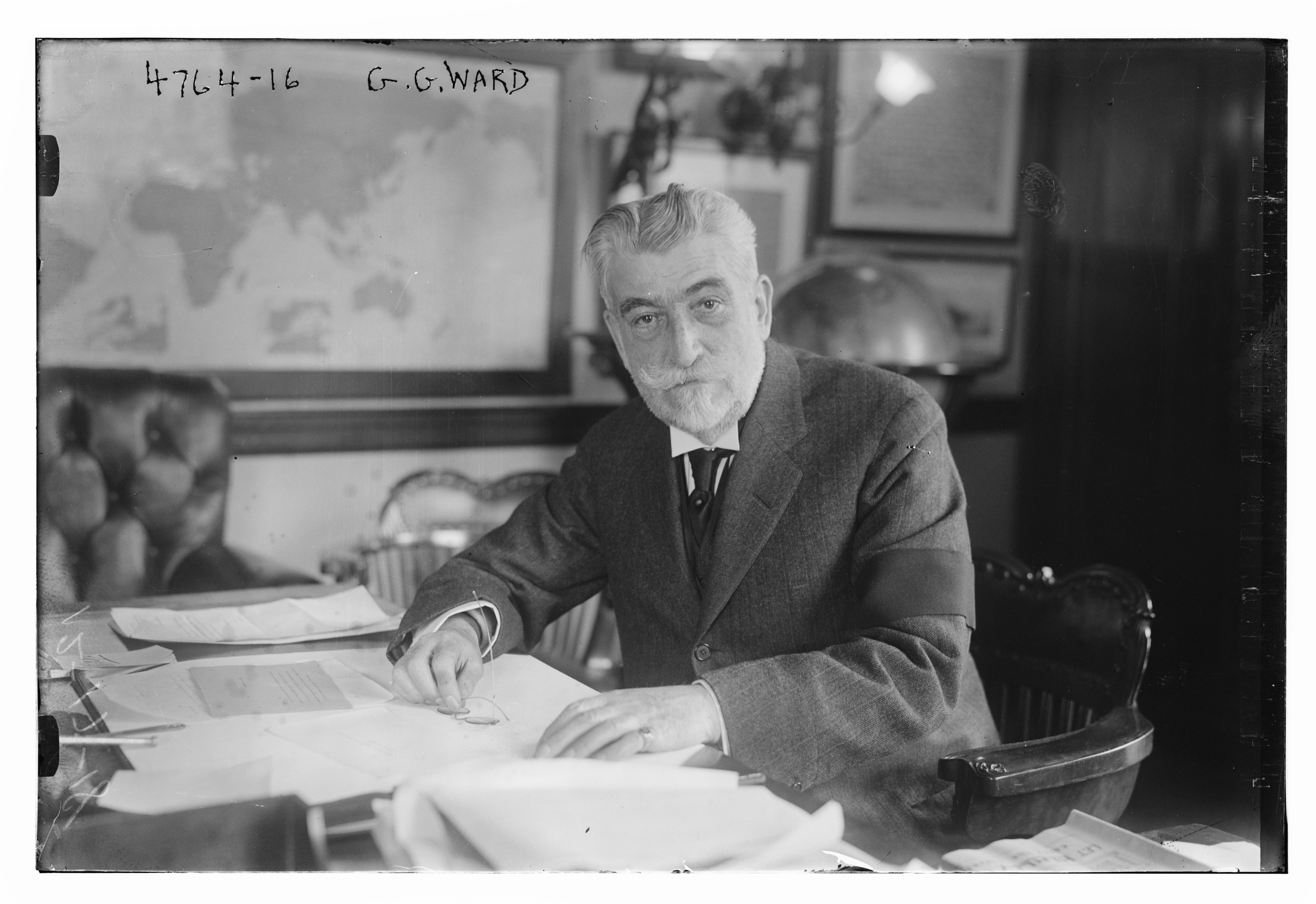
George Gray Ward, Vice President and General Manager of the Commercial Cable Company, c. 1918

Domestically the cable distributed its cable traffic through its partner firm the Postal Telegraph Company. It had a twenty-five percent share ownership in the Commercial Pacific Cable Company that operated a cable from San Francisco to Manila and Shanghai after 1906. Together these companies were all part of the Mackay Companies, also known as the Associated Companies.

John Mackay's son, Clarence Mackay, took over the firm by the early 20th century and led it during World War I. Clarence Mackay and Frank Polk, a senior State Department official, were friends and this enabled the State Department to have access to selected diplomatic traffic carried over Commercial's cables. The company flourished for a time but in 1928, together with other elements of the Mackay System, came under the control of International Telephone and Telegraph (ITT) under a wholly owned subsidiary, the Postal Telegraph & Cable Corporation. This would be reorganized in 1935, with Commercial Cable becoming part of the American Cable and Radio Corporation. The undersea cables remained in use carrying telegraph traffic until 1962. In 1998, cables were briefly visible going out to sea at Waterville and are probably still there.

== Buildings ==
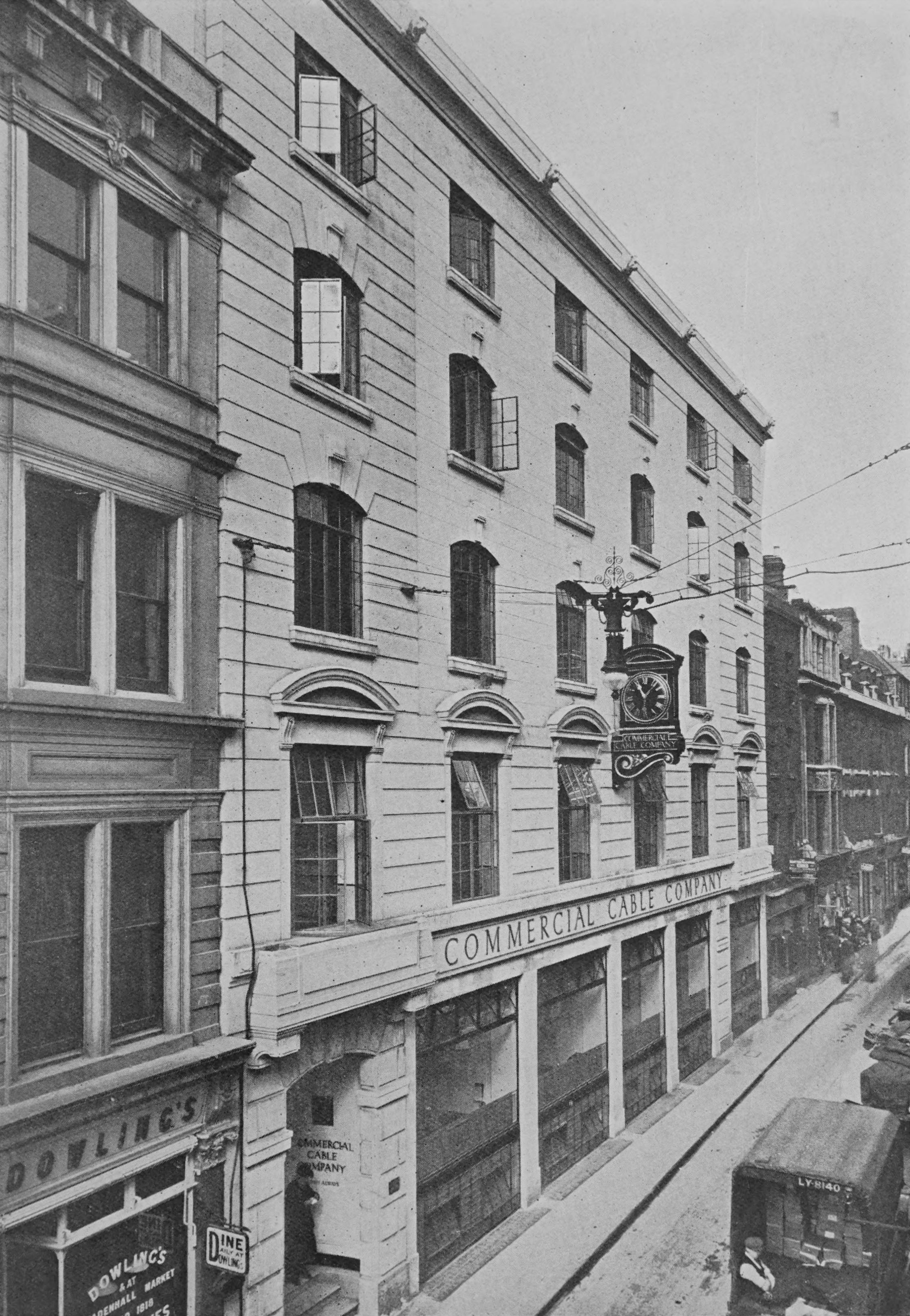
The 1922 City of London office on Wormwood Street, designed by Edward Maufe

The Commercial Cable Company Building was one of New York City's early skyscrapers. Constructed in 1897, it was demolished in 1954.

A two and a half story Neo-Classical brick and granite building in Hazel Hill, Nova Scotia built in 1888 was the last trans-Atlantic station remaining. Despite the historic significance — the station helped send cables on the sinking of the RMS Titanic and at the end of World War I) — it was torn down in 2017 due to safety concerns around its state of disrepair. There are plans to build a space port in the area.
