= Home Life Building =

Office skyscraper in Manhattan, New York

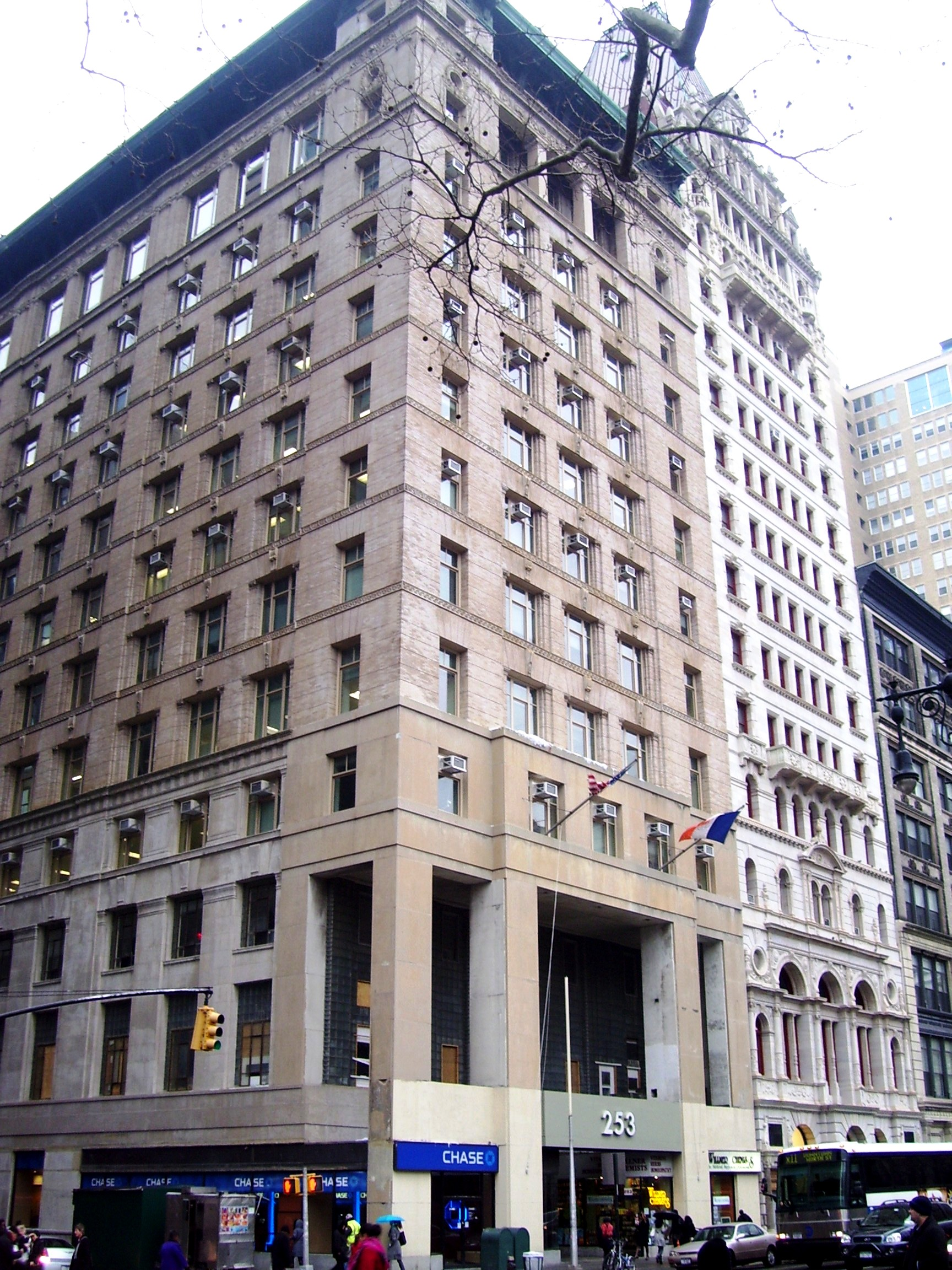
- The Home Life Building includes the original Home Life structure at 256 Broadway (right) and the Postal Telegraph Building at 253 Broadway (left).
- Former names: Home Life Insurance Company Building, Postal Telegraph Building

General information
- Type: Office
- Architectural style: Renaissance Revival (Home Life); Neoclassical (Postal Telegraph)
- Location: 251–257 Broadway, Manhattan, New York, United States
- Coordinates: 40°42′48″N 74°00′27″W
- Construction started: 1892
- Completed: 1894
- Renovated: 1937–1938, 1984
- Owner: Government of New York City

Height
- Roof: 256 feet (78 m)
- Top floor: 16

Technical details
- Structural system: Steel
- Material: Marble (Home Life); Limestone, brick, terracotta (Postal Telegraph)
- Floor count: 16 (Home Life); 13 (Postal Telegraph)

Design and construction
- Architects: Napoleon LeBrun & Sons (Home Life); George Edward Harding & Gooch (Postal Telegraph)

New York City Landmark
- Designated: November 12, 1991
- Reference no.: 1751

The Home Life Building, also known as 253 Broadway, is an office building in Lower Manhattan, New York City. It is in Manhattan's Tribeca and Civic Center neighborhoods at the northwest corner of Broadway and Murray Street, adjacent to City Hall Park.

The Home Life Building is made of two adjacent structures at 251–257 Broadway, erected between 1892 and 1894 as separate buildings. The original 16-story Home Life Insurance Company Building at 256 Broadway was designed by Napoleon LeBrun & Sons in the Renaissance Revival style. The 13-story Postal Telegraph Building, immediately to the south at 253 Broadway, was designed by George Edward Harding & Gooch in the neoclassical style. The original Home Life Building is clad with marble, while the Postal Telegraph Building's facade consists of limestone at its base and brick on its upper stories. Ornamental details are used on both structures.

256 Broadway was erected for the Home Life Insurance Company, while 253 Broadway was erected for the Postal Telegraph Company. Both buildings were constructed simultaneously between 1892 and 1894. Although 256 Broadway was intended as a 12-story building, it was expanded to 16 stories mid-construction, making it one of the tallest buildings in the city when it was completed. After the Home Life Company bought 253 Broadway in 1947, the two buildings were joined internally to form a single structure, and became collectively known as the Home Life Building. The Home Life Company occupied the building until 1985. It was made a New York City designated landmark in 1991.

== Architecture ==
The Home Life Building is in the Civic Center and Tribeca neighborhoods of Manhattan, just west of New York City Hall and City Hall Park. It is on the northwest corner of Broadway and Murray Street, south of the Rogers Peet Building. The Home Life Building is composed of two formerly separate structures: the Postal Telegraph Company Building on 253 Broadway, at the corner with Murray Street, and the original Home Life Insurance Company Building at 256 Broadway, immediately to the north. The New York City Department of Citywide Administrative Services administers most of the Home Life Building, with New York City government offices on the upper floors. A private owner controls the basements and ground level. The Home Life Building is one of the few remaining major insurance company "home office" structures in New York City. (Note: The others include: Former New York Life Insurance Company Building at 346 Broadway; Germania Life Building at 50 Union Square East; New York Life Building at 50 Madison Avenue; Metropolitan Life Insurance Company Tower at 1 Madison Avenue; Equitable Building at 120 Broadway)

253 Broadway, also known as the Postal Telegraph Building or the Commercial Cable Building, was designed by George Edward Harding & Gooch in the neoclassical style. It is 13 stories high, although the top floor is labeled as the 14th due to the perception of thirteen being unlucky. There are also two basement levels. According to a contemporary news articles, it is 166 feet (51 m) tall. (Note: Emporis states that the main roof is 190 feet (58 m) high and its tip is 200 feet (61 m) high.)

256 Broadway, the original Home Life Building, was designed by Napoleon LeBrun & Sons in the Renaissance Revival style, (Note: Emporis lists 256 Broadway as being designed in the Beaux Arts style. This is disputed by the New York City Landmarks Preservation Commission, as well as architecture writers Sarah Landau and Carl W. Condit.) with influences from both Italian Renaissance and French Renaissance designs. The leading architect was likely Pierre Lassus LeBrun. It is 16 stories tall, counting a dormer in its gable roof, and reaches 256 feet (78 m) tall above the curb, including its gable roof. (Note: Emporis states that the original Home Life Building's main roof height is 230 feet (70 m) above the curb, with the tip of the roof at 279 feet (85 m).) There are also two basement levels. Although 256 Broadway did not break any height records, it was one of the tallest buildings in the city at the time of its completion, and one of fifteen office buildings in the city taller than 250 feet (76 m) in 1900.

=== Form ===
253 Broadway extends 70.5 feet (21.5 m) north along Broadway and 155.5 feet (47 m) west along Murray Street. It is shaped like an "L", extending west along Murray Street and then north to the Rogers Peet Building. The westernmost portion of the Murray Street arm extends 100 feet (30 m) north and is 50 feet (15 m) wide.

256 Broadway extends 55.5 feet (16.9 m) along Broadway with a lot 109 feet (33 m) deep. 256 Broadway has light courts on the north and south, which were intended to illuminate the interior space. The light courts give the structure an "H" shape, with two rectangular sections connected by a corridor adjacent to the light courts. The deeper section of the "H" faces east toward Broadway, while the shallower section faces west. The westernmost part of 256 Broadway abuts the L-shaped forms of 253 Broadway and the Rogers Peet Building.

=== Facade ===
The facade of 253 Broadway is made of light stone on the first four stories, and of light-gray brick and terracotta on the remaining stories. The design of 253 Broadway emphasizes horizontal layering, with sill courses between each story, three intermediate cornices, and a large bronze cornice at the top. The lowest levels are recessed behind the main facade, while the loggia on the twelfth story is taller than on 256 Broadway.

The facade of 256 Broadway is of Tuckahoe marble. The facade emphasizes its vertical components, with three-part arcades stacked on each other, as well as ornamental details concentrated at the base and top. 256 Broadway's facade is divided into three vertical sections: a three-story base, a nine-story shaft with two transitional stories, and a two-story capital with a steep pyramidal roof. The two interior light courts have a facade of brick.

==== 253 Broadway ====
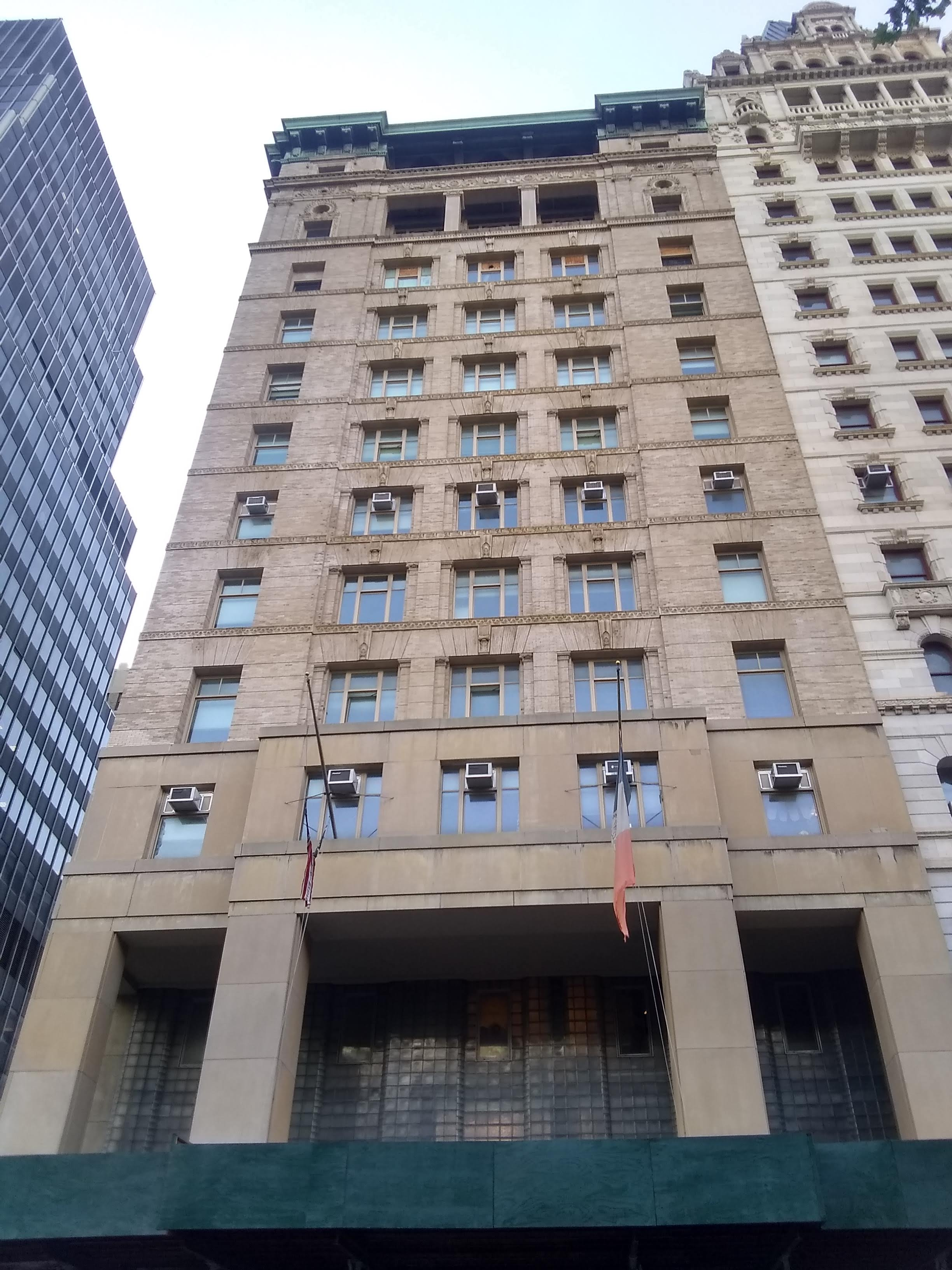
Facade of 253 Broadway, with its glass blocked loggia at bottom

253 Broadway has eleven windows per floor on Murray Street and five windows per floor on Broadway. The Murray Street elevation contains four vertical ribs that divide the center nine windows into three bays with three windows each; the outermost columns of windows are treated as "towers" with one window per floor. On the Broadway elevation, the single-window-wide towers flank a central bay with three windows. The corner towers contain a window-and-rondel motif.

The main entrance to 253 Broadway, on the eastern elevation, is 30 feet (9.1 m) wide and contains a doorway to the main lobby. In the original design, smaller doors flanked either side of the main lobby; the left door led to the ground floor space while the right door led to the second floor. The main entrance is under a slightly projecting rectangular vestibule that extends to the third story and is supported by two pillars. The entrance was originally capped by bas-reliefs representing light and electricity. A side entrance for Postal Telegraph employees was also provided on Murray Street in the original design. The side entrances on Broadway were removed in a 1937–1938 renovation, as were the small storefronts under the loggia on either side of the entrance. The storefront on the left, at the Murray Street corner, was restored between 1990 and 1991. The 2nd and 3rd stories on Broadway are clad with glass bricks and recessed within a loggia supported by four columns.

Above the 6th through 11th floors, there are terracotta courses with alternating classical motifs. The courses above the even-numbered floors contain floral forms, while those above the odd-numbered floors contain rinceau friezes. A loggia extends across the 12th story on Broadway, with Ionic-style capitals atop the loggia's square columns, as well as Doric-style antae. The 13th story contains balconies between the corner bays, facing both Murray Street and Broadway. There is a small copper cornice above the 12th story, and a larger copper cornice above the 13th story.

==== 256 Broadway ====
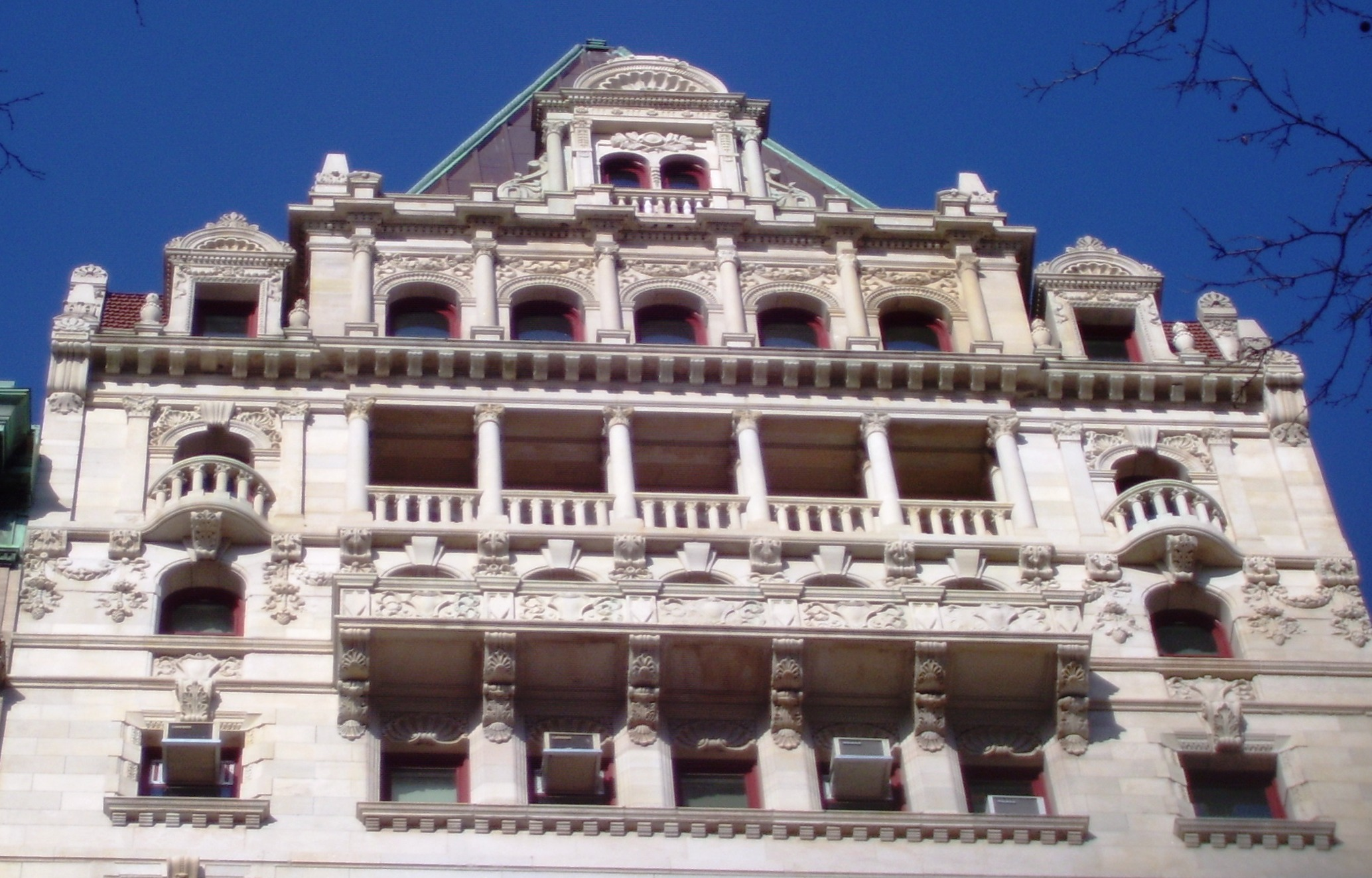
Top of the Home Life Building

The facade of 256 Broadway is five bays wide at ground level. The ground floor contains a rusticated arcade topped by an entablature, except in the center bay, which has a balustrade. The northernmost bay of the ground floor contains a window within what was formerly the main entrance, while the southernmost bay is a freight entrance; these doorways have columns flanking either side as well as metal plaques above them. At ground level, the center bay projects slightly and has a glass door. On the 2nd floor, there is another arcade with elaborate columns. The three center bays on the 2nd story have large arched openings, with mullions supporting an entablature below the top of the arch, while the two outer bays contain smaller arches underneath the entablature as well as circular windows above it. There are elaborate reliefs on the second-story arcade.

The 3rd floor of 256 Broadway is consistent with the 4th floor of 253 Broadway. (Note: From bottom to top, the first three stories of 253 Broadway are respectively 15, 15, and 11 feet high, for a total height of 41 feet (12 m) excluding two floor slabs. The first two stories are 18.5 and 23.5 feet high, for a total height of 42 feet (13 m) excluding one floor slab. 253 Broadway's 4th floor and 256 Broadway's 3rd floor are thus at the same height.) The center bay of the 3rd floor contains an aedicule with two windows, topped by a pediment and flanked by pilasters. The other windows on the 3rd floor are single arched windows. A sill course separates the 3rd and 4th floors, except at the center bay, which is interrupted by the pediment. The 4th through 12th stories have seven windows on each story: five in the center and one on either of the outer bays. The windows of these stories are rectangular, except on the 4th floor where they are arched. The 5th and 13th stories have marble balconies supported by brackets and decorated with classical motifs. Ornamental shells are located above the tops of the center windows on the 12th floor. Band courses separate each of the shaft floors, and there are bracketed sills underneath the windows of each floor, the center sills being continuous with each other.

The windows on the 13th through 15th stories are arched. The five center windows on the 14th story are recessed behind a colonnade with a balustrade, creating a loggia, although the two outer windows have their own slightly-projecting balconies. The 15th and 16th floors are situated within a steep copper-bronze pyramidal roof, and contain dormers. The 15th floor has a colonnade for the five center windows and dormers for the two outermost windows. The 16th floor consists of one aedicule with two windows, similar to on the 3rd floor. Copper dormers with round pediments project from the north and south sides of the roof on the 15th floor. The pinnacle is constructed of tie and angle iron.

=== Features ===
==== Structural features ====
253 Broadway uses a metal skeletal frame for its superstructure. The frame includes cast iron columns and steel beams and girders. The front and rear walls of 253 Broadway were load-bearing walls below the 6th floor and carried by girders above that story. 253 Broadway's floors are built upon steel beams infilled with flat terracotta arches and covered with cement. 253 Broadway's structural beams were laid out so that the floors could carry a total live and dead load of 175 pounds per square foot (850 kg/m^{2}). All of the interior partitions were made of terracotta or fireproof blocks. The main corridors in 253 Broadway were wainscoted with marble, and mosaic floor tile was used in the halls and other areas.

256 Broadway uses a skeletal frame made almost entirely of wrought steel, with self-supporting outer walls made of marble. Terracotta and brick was used to enclose the interior steel frame. The curtain walls ranged in thickness from 28 inches (710 mm) in the two basement levels to 12 inches (300 mm) on the upper stories. The foundations of 256 Broadway were excavated to a depth of 23 feet (7.0 m). There are structural columns in the center of 256 Broadway's lot as well as on the edges. 256 Broadway's structural beams were laid out so that the floors could carry a total live and dead load of 175 pounds per square foot (850 kg/m^{2}). The interiors used wooden floors, and as built, the stairs and elevator screens were of cast iron, wrought iron, and marble. "Costly marbles" were used to decorate the lower floors' corridors.

==== Interior ====
The southern half of 253 Broadway's ground floor is a 100-by-25-foot (30.5 by 7.6 m) room, which housed Postal Telegraph's shipping, messenger, delivery, and warehouse operations. The 2nd through 9th floors were intended for use by other tenants; the 2nd floor had a banking space while the 3rd through 9th floors contained offices. The 10th and 11th floors were used as Postal Telegraph's main offices. The ground and 2nd floors have ceilings of 15 feet (4.6 m), while the 3rd through 11th floors have ceilings of 11 feet (3.4 m). The 12th floor had a ceiling of 19 feet (5.8 m) and contained Postal Telegraph's switchboards, transmitters, and receivers. Iron stairways with marble steps extended from the ground floor to the roof, and four elevators were provided: two elevators serving all floors and two others running from the lobby to the four upper floors. The elevators used call buttons, a then-new technology that the New York Tribune said eliminated the need for passengers to request elevators by yelling "up" or "down". The original elevators were themselves the first electric elevators commissioned by Frank J. Sprague. The Postal Telegraph Building also had one of the first revolving doors in New York City.

Inside 256 Broadway, the northern half of the ground floor originally served as a banking hall for the Merchants' Exchange National Bank. The second floor contained the main offices of the Home Life Insurance Company. The ground floor had a ceiling of 18.5 feet (5.6 m), while the second floor had a ceiling of 23.5 feet (7.2 m). When opened, 256 Broadway was also outfitted with its own electric plant and three hydraulic elevators, located in the two basement levels of the building. 256 Broadway also contained brass plumbing and iron elevator grillwork.

== History ==
=== Context ===
Historically, the land was part of the farm holdings of Trinity Church. The surrounding area was developed as the Civic Center by the 19th century, with the construction of New York City Hall, the Tweed Courthouse, and the City Hall Post Office in City Hall. In addition, the adjoining stretch of Broadway became a commercial corridor in the mid-19th century, with four- and five-story commercial buildings.

One of the commercial concerns on Broadway was the Home Life Insurance Company, a Brooklyn-based insurance company with a branch on Wall Street, which moved its branch to 258 Broadway in 1866. Home Life acquired the five-story building at 254 Broadway three years afterward, where it occupied the ground story and leased the remaining space. Records showed that Home Life had intended to acquire the neighboring property at 253 Broadway instead. By 1890, Home Life's headquarters were overcrowded.

Another commercial concern on Broadway was the Postal Telegraph Company, formed in the 1880s by John William Mackay, who built the Postal network by purchasing existing telegraph firms that were insolvent. By 1890, the Postal Telegraph Company had become a viable competitor to Western Union. Its headquarters was also overcrowded, and management had to move out to make room for more operations staff.

=== Construction ===
By February 1892, Postal Telegraph had decided to build a new headquarters at Broadway and Murray Street, next to Home Life's building. The Home Life Insurance Company purchased 256 Broadway from Trinity Church on March 16, 1892. It simultaneously sold off the lot at 254 Broadway, which had 20 feet (6.1 m) of frontage on Broadway. One week later, Postal Telegraph signed a 99-year lease agreement with Trinity Church to lease the adjacent lots at 251–254 Broadway. The two companies applied for their building permits three months apart: Postal Telegraph in May 1892 and Home Life in August 1892.

==== 253 Broadway ====
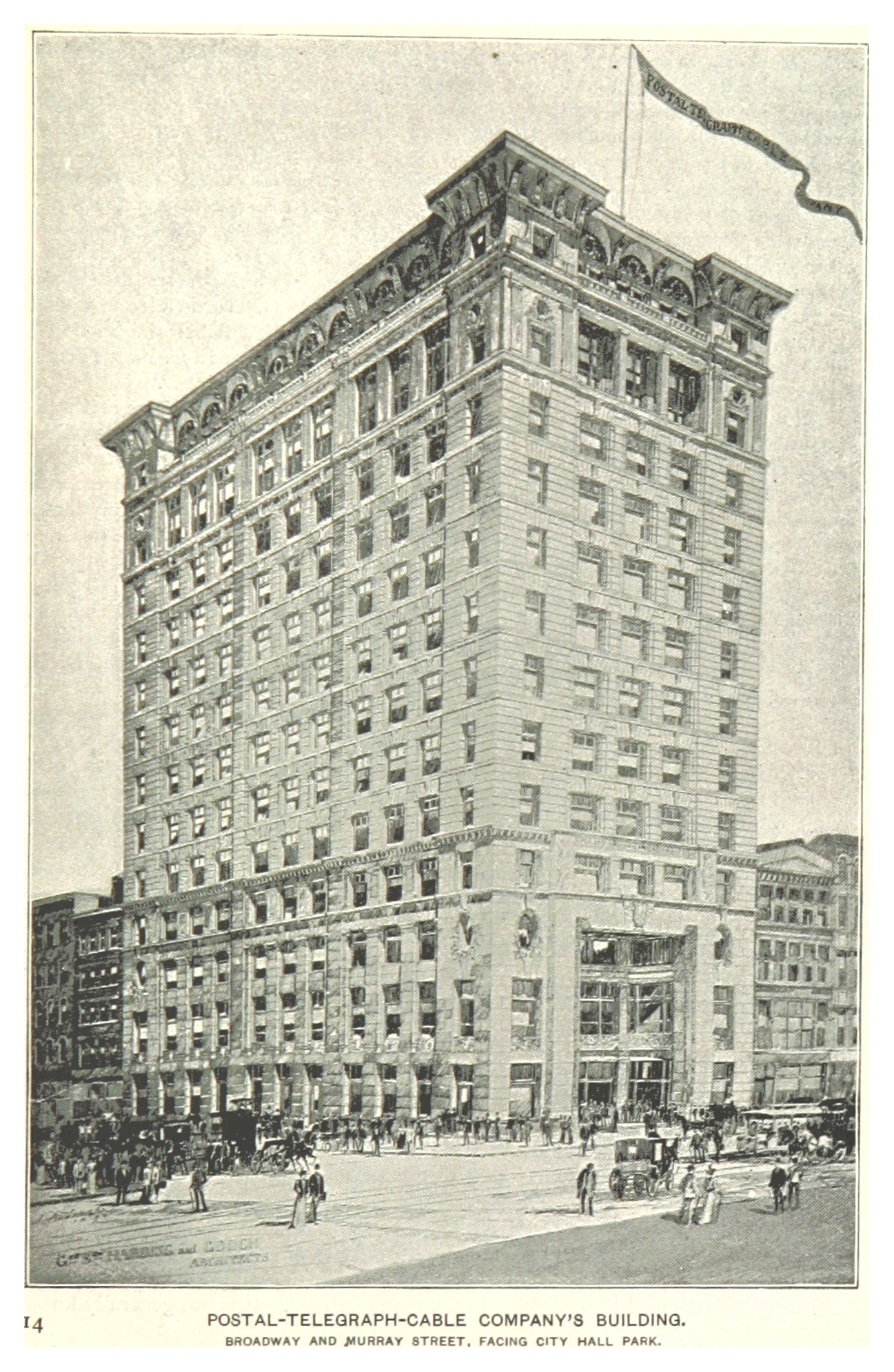
Postal Telegraph Building in 1893

The terms of Postal Telegraph's lease required Mackay to pay for the demolition of existing buildings on the site, and build a structure at least 10 stories tall. The lease prohibited serving of alcoholic beverages below the third story of Postal Telegraph's new building. Harding and Gooch were selected as architects for the Postal Telegraph Building, apparently through an architectural design competition.

Construction on that Postal Telegraph Building began on June 14, 1892. During the Postal Life Building's construction, there were at least two worker deaths: one in February 1893 when a derrick fell, and another that May when a worker fell off the roof. Additionally, the Postal Life Building's project superintendent was seriously injured in October 1893 when he was shot by a homeless man looking for work.

==== 256 Broadway ====
Home Life held a design competition for its planned headquarters, with six architecture firms competing. (Note: The firms were McKim, Mead & White; Harding & Gooch; Babb, Cook & Willard; Napoleon LeBrun & Sons; Carrère and Hastings; and Brunner & Tryon.) The judge, William Robert Ware, selected Napoleon LeBrun & Sons as the winning architects. The plan called for a 208-foot-tall (63 m) building with three stories at the base, eight stories in the shaft, and a dormer and pediment under a peaked roof. At the time, life insurance companies generally had their own buildings for their offices and branch locations. According to architectural writer Kenneth Gibbs, these buildings allowed each individual company to instill "not only its name but also a favorable impression of its operations" in the general public. This had been a trend since 1870, with the completion of the former Equitable Life Building in Manhattan's Financial District. Furthermore, life insurance companies of the late 19th and early 20th centuries generally built massive buildings to fit their large clerical and records-keeping staff.

Work on 253 Broadway began on November 2, 1892. During construction, Home Life took up space in the New York World Building. The original plans called for Home Life's building to be 12 stories tall, extending 30.5 feet (9.3 m) on Broadway and 107 feet (33 m) deep. Excavations for Home Life's building caused the adjacent building at 257 Broadway, occupied by the Merchants' Exchange National Bank, to tilt 18 inches (460 mm) out of alignment. The 257 Broadway building had shallower foundations, and the settling caused the top of the bank building to trespass upon Home Life's property. Home Life was already seeking extra space, and it acquired the bank building in early 1893; in exchange, the bank would occupy the ground and basement stories of the Home Life's building. The design was accordingly revised to 16 stories, with 55 feet (17 m) of frontage on Broadway. At the time, the superstructure had already reached the seventh floor, and the roof was not significantly changed.

=== Use ===
==== Completion and fire ====
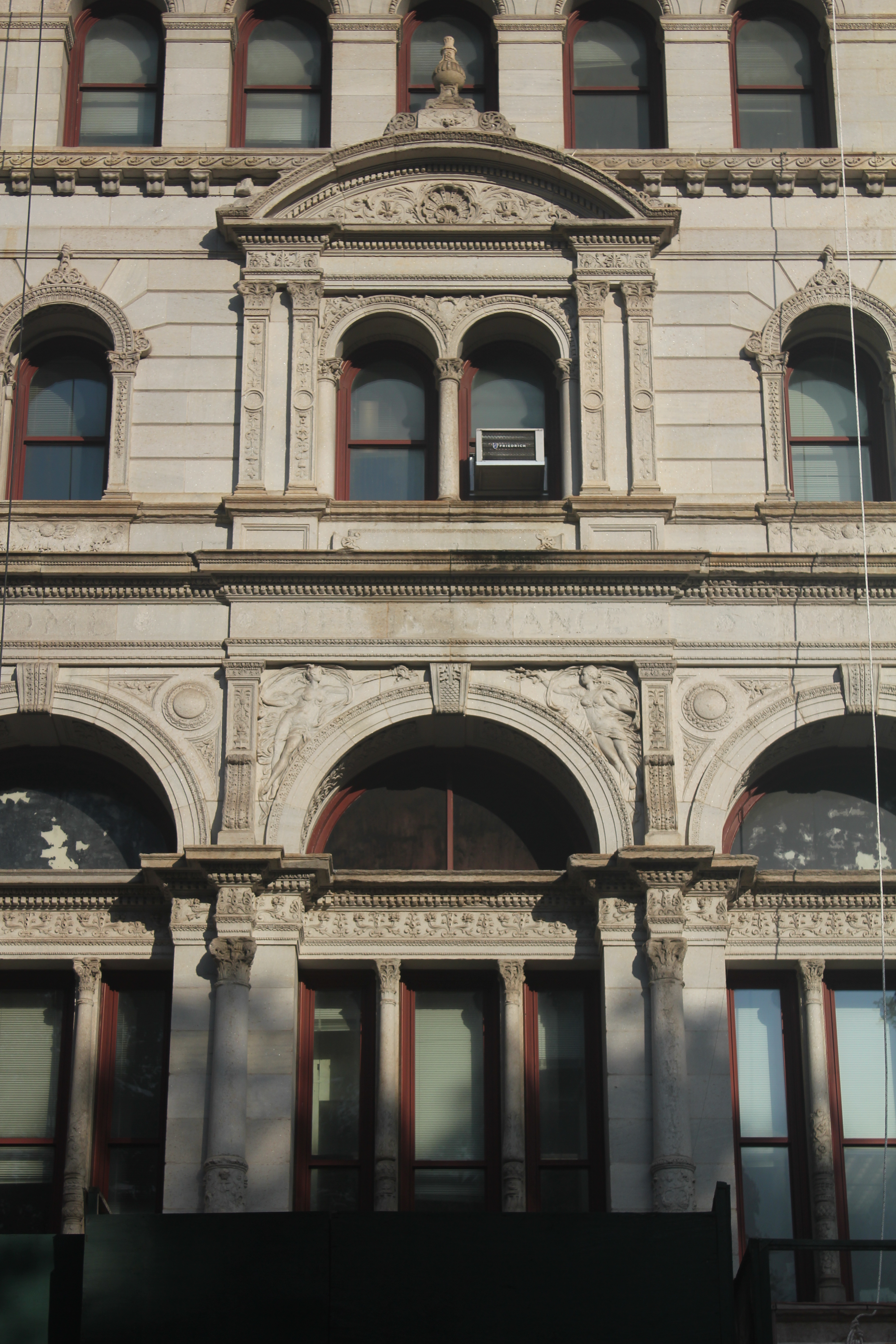
Detail of windows at the Home Life Building's base

The Postal Telegraph and Commercial Cable companies had held a dinner in May 1894 to celebrate the completion of 253 Broadway. Work on both buildings was formally completed that August, with a city building inspector approving occupancy certificates for both buildings on the same day. Upon the structures' completion, the Real Estate Record and Guide stated that both buildings had "a good deal of unoccupied space", but that leasing agents for the buildings stated that there were many tenants coming into the Home Life Building, and that the Postal Telegraph Building was seeing high profits from leasing. One of the early tenants in the Home Life Building was the New York City Rapid Transit Commission, forerunner to the New York City Board of Transportation. At 253 Broadway, Postal Telegraph took the top three floors, a section of the basement, and a ground-floor corner office. Sprague Electric also occupied offices there. Postal Telegraph acquired the ground lease for 253 Broadway in 1897.

The buildings were damaged in a December 1898 fire that started at the Rogers Peet Building at 258 Broadway. (Note: The building that caught fire in 1898 was the predecessor of the current building at the same site.) The New York City Fire Department was unable to reach the top stories of 256 Broadway, although external damage only reached that building's 8th floor. 256 Broadway suffered a loss worth about 22% of its $900,000 estimated value. The floor materials used in the two buildings affected the amount of damage they sustained. The interior of 256 Broadway was completely gutted, except for walls, ceilings, and floor slabs, because the fire had been able to spread through the wooden floors of that structure. 253 Broadway, which featured cement floors, saw comparatively minor damage, with only the 13th floor being affected.

After the fire, opponents of skyscrapers used the damage at 256 Broadway as an example for their cause, while supporters cited the fact that both structures were still structurally sound. Fire codes had been changed in 1897 so that buildings taller than 75 feet (23 m) had to be fireproof. The lowest eight floors of 256 Broadway's facade, severely damaged by the fire, were rebuilt. Another fire broke out at the top floor of 253 Broadway in 1900, but as with the fire two years earlier, only the 13th floor was affected. A high-pressure fire-suppression system was also activated in Lower Manhattan in 1908, providing protection to both buildings.

==== Early 20th century ====
Home Life moved its headquarters from Brooklyn to 256 Broadway in 1906. The company gradually expanded its presence in 256 Broadway; it only occupied the 2nd through 6th floors in 1916, but was using fifteen full floors by the 1940s. The ground floor and basement of 256 Broadway contained the First National City Bank from 1936 to 1964. Next door, Postal Telegraph continued to be the main occupant at 253 Broadway until 1928, when it moved to the International Telephone Building at 67 Broad Street. Despite having moved out, Postal Telegraph extended its lease of 253 Broadway with Trinity Church in 1929.

In 1930, the Corn Exchange Bank acquired the ground lease for the building. In 1936, Junior Leasing Corporation bought 253 Broadway at an assessed value of $1.45 million, as well as took over Corn Exchange Bank's ground lease. A $1 million renovation of 253 Broadway, designed by Ely Jacques Kahn, was completed the next year, and 253 Broadway became known as the Paragon Building. The first three floors were refaced in glass blocks; the spaces above the ground-floor stores were recessed; the windows were replaced; five new elevators were installed; and new air conditioning, plumbing, and wiring systems were installed. Postal Telegraph moved back to 253 Broadway in 1939, signing a long-term lease for six floors in the building. Four years later, Postal Telegraph merged with Western Union. The space vacated by Postal Telegraph was filled by the federal government of the United States during World War II, including a unit of the United States Treasury. During this time, the ground floor space was occupied by Wallach's Inc. and the basement housed a branch of the Longchamps restaurant chain.

==== Merger and later use ====
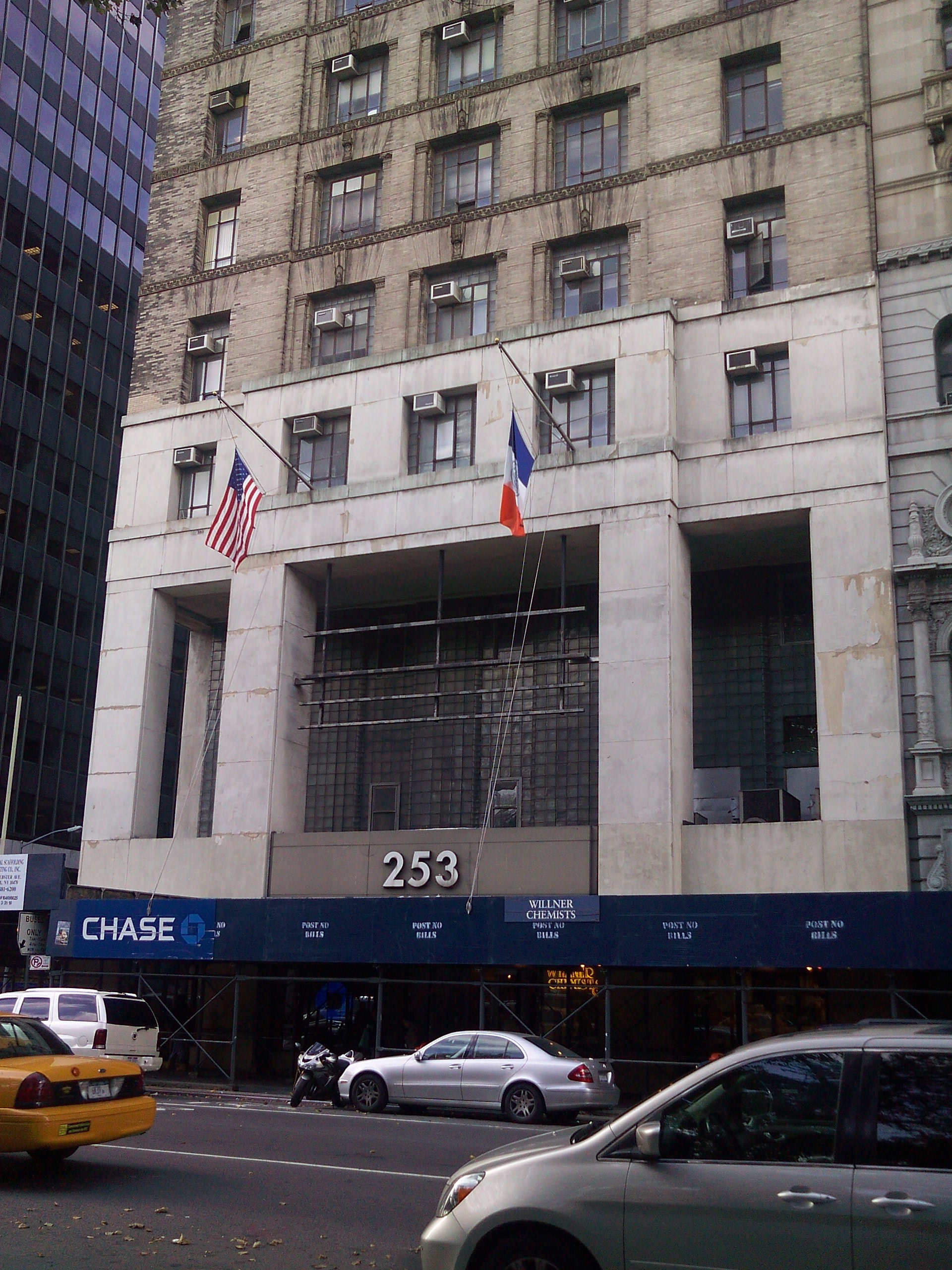
Facade of 253 Broadway, which serves as the main entrance to the Home Life Building after the two structures' merger

Home Life acquired 253 Broadway in November 1946, paying Trinity Church $1.7 million in cash. The agreement was finalized in January 1947. Openings were created in the party wall between 253 and 256 Broadway, and staircases were built to connect the corridors in the two formerly-separate buildings. By doing this, Home Life more than doubled the amount of usable space it had.

The main entrance was relocated to 253 Broadway in 1963, while the ground floor of 256 Broadway became retail space. The entrance to 256 Broadway was replaced with a show window. The ground floor and basement of 256 Broadway was leased in 1964 by women's shop Plymouth Shops, Inc. Sapolsky & Slobodien installed air conditioning and replaced the windows between 1963 and 1969. A subsequent renovation was undertaken by Ira Greenburg in 1984, and the following October, 253 Broadway Associates bought the combined building.

In 1988, the New York City Board of Estimate approved a plan for the government of New York City to rent and later buy the Home Life Building for $26 million. The Home Life Building was split vertically into two condominiums in 1989. The basement through second floor was owned by 253 Broadway Associates and used as retail space, while the upper floors were owned by the New York City government and used as offices; parts of the third floor were jointly owned. Among the agencies that had taken space in the city-owned portion of the building were the New York City Department of Housing Preservation and Development and the Mayor's Fund to Advance New York City. In 1991, the New York City Landmarks Preservation Commission (LPC) designated the building as a landmark.

The LPC started renovating six floors in the Home Life Building in 2016, intending to move its offices there the next year. However, the renovation's expected completion date was subsequently delayed to 2021, and the renovation cost increased from $29 million to $62 million. The city government announced in 2017 that it would renovate the Home Life Building with an estimated budget of $18.5 million. In 2025, the LPC moved into its new offices and public hearing room space, which one reporter praised for its "light and internal transparency".

== Critical reception ==
When the buildings were completed in 1894, a writer for the Real Estate Record and Guide stated that they "war violently with one another, and the pity is, the strife is one [that] time can not mitigate". The writer concluded that "either would be better were the other away". Later critics did not view the different designs as conflicting. Architectural writers Sarah Landau and Carl W. Condit stated in 1996 that "it is hard to understand what seemed in 1894 so egregious", with the "only jarring discordance" being the glass blocks on 253 Broadway. In 2011, architectural critic Christopher Gray wrote in The New York Times that Postal Telegraph's "precise gray brick" building and Home Life's marble structure "almost civic in character" contrasted with each other.

According to Gray, 253 Broadway initially received heavy criticism from architectural critics, even though "to 21st-century eyes the Postal Telegraph Building looks dull but inoffensive." The Real Estate Record writer from 1894 said that "the obstreperousness of commerce fairly protrudes" from 253 Broadway, and that "its defects are gross". Three years later, the Architectural Record published an article that criticized 253 Broadway's shaft as "honestly ugly", but less bad compared to the base and capital, which the unnamed critic derided as "goocheries".

256 Broadway was better received, albeit with fewer reviews until the early 20th century. One critical review came from the Real Estate Record, which in 1894 wrote that 256 Broadway gave a "festal" impression "that contradicts the grim commercialism of the actuary". Montgomery Schuyler wrote in 1910 that 256 Broadway's facade was "skillfully and tastefully expressed".
