= Albert Brown Chandler =

American businessman

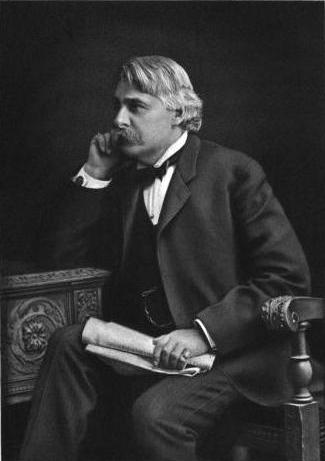
- Chandler as depicted in 1903's Genealogical and Family History of the State of Vermont

Personal details
- Born: August 20, 1840 Randolph, Vermont
- Died: February 23, 1923 (aged 82) Randolph, Vermont
- Resting place: South View Cemetery, Randolph, Vermont
- Party: Republican
- Spouse(s): Marilla Eunice Stedman; Mildred Vivian
- Children: 3
- Education: Randolph Academy, Randolph, Vermont
- Occupation: Telegraph operator Business executive
- Known for: Confidential telegrapher, President Abraham Lincoln; President, Postal Telegraph Company
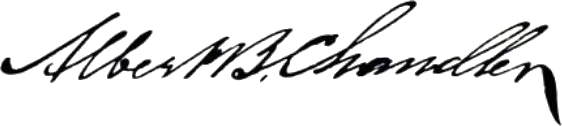
- Signature

Military service
- Allegiance: United States; State of Vermont
- Branch/service: Vermont Militia
- Years of service: 1895-1898
- Rank: Colonel
- Unit: Staff of Governor Urban A. Woodbury; Staff of Governor Josiah Grout

Albert Brown Chandler (August 20, 1840 – February 23, 1923) was an American corporate executive. He was notable for his association with Abraham Lincoln during Chandler's service as a War Department telegraph operator during the American Civil War, and his later work as president of the Postal Telegraph Company.

== Early life ==
Albert B. Chandler was born in Randolph, Vermont on August 20, 1840, one of thirteen children born to William Brown and Electa (Owen) Chandler. He was educated in the local schools of Randolph and the Randolph Academy. He lived near a print shop in Randolph, as well as the local telegraph office, which enabled him to acquire training in both trades while he was still a teenager.

Chandler became a telegraph operator for Western Union, and managed the office in Bellaire, Ohio from 1858 to 1859. From 1859 to 1863 he was the agent of the Cleveland & Pittsburgh Railroad in Manchester, Pennsylvania.

== American Civil War service ==
In June 1863, Chandler began work at the War Department as a disbursing clerk, cashier, and telegraph operator in the U.S. Military Telegraph Corps. He developed ciphers for transmitting secret communications, and worked with Thomas Eckert and Charles A. Tinker as confidential telegraphers for President Abraham Lincoln and Secretary of War Edwin Stanton. After the war Chandler returned to Western Union, where he was in charge of completing new cables for operation of Transatlantic telegraph service, and for service between the United States and Cuba.

== Corporate executive ==
In 1875, Chandler became general manager of the Atlantic and Pacific Telegraph Company. When A&P merged with Western Union, Chandler became President of Fuller Electric Company, the developer of electric arc lighting. In 1885 he joined the Postal Telegraph Company, which became Western Union's chief competitor, and he eventually became Postal's president. He was an executive or board of directors member for numerous other corporations, including the Commercial Cable Company of Cuba, Pacific Postal Telegraph Company, Commercial Telegraph Company, Brooklyn District Telegraph Company, New England Telegraph Company, Otis Elevator Company, New York Quotation Company, Carnegie Trust Company, and Federal Safe Deposit Company.

Chandler maintained homes in Brooklyn, New York and Randolph. From 1895 to 1898 he served as aide-de-camp on the military staffs of Governors of Vermont Urban A. Woodbury and Josiah Grout with the rank of colonel.

At the 1896 National Electrical Exposition in New York City, Chandler transmitted the first around the world telegram. The message, written by Chauncey M. Depew in an exhibit hall to Edward Dean Adams of the Niagara Falls Power Company at another location in the same building, traveled 16,000 miles on cables owned entirely by the Postal Telegraph Company, and was received and transcribed by Thomas A. Edison four minutes after it had been sent.

== Author ==
Chandler's memories of Lincoln and the Civil War were included in the 1895 newspaper article and book Abraham Lincoln: Tributes From His Associates. Chandler kept a journal for more than 50 years, which was later privately published. His recollections from the 1860s (minus the volume for 1863, the location of which is unknown) are a valuable reference about the War Department during the Civil War.

== Religion and philanthropy ==
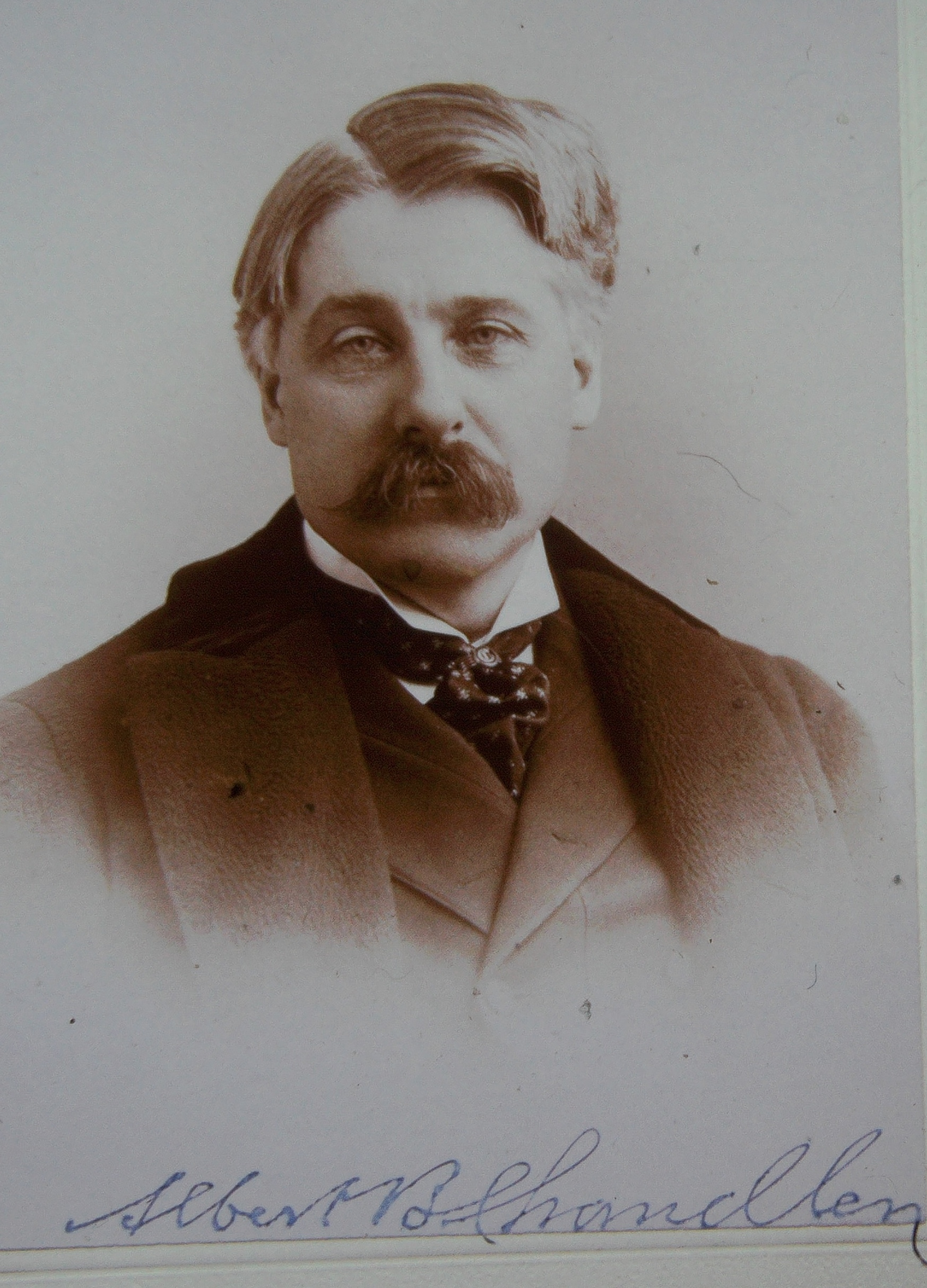
Chandler photo with signature

Chandler was a member of Brooklyn's Lafayette Avenue Presbyterian Church. When in Vermont he attended Bethany Congregational Church in Randolph.

Chandler donated to numerous charitable causes and civic projects in both New York and Vermont. In 1907 he paid to construct Randolph's Chandler Music Hall, a theater which has been recognized nationwide for superior acoustics that make it an ideal location for live performances.

== Family ==
On October 11, 1864, Chandler married Marilla Eunice Stedman of Randolph. Their children included daughter Florence, who died in childhood, and sons Albert Eckert and Willis Derwin.

His wife died in September, 1907, and in 1910 Chandler married Mildred Vivian of New York City, who had once been a stenographer at the Postal Telegraph Company.

== Death and burial ==
Chandler died in Randolph on February 3, 1923. He was buried at South View Cemetery in Randolph.
