= Postal Telegraph Company =

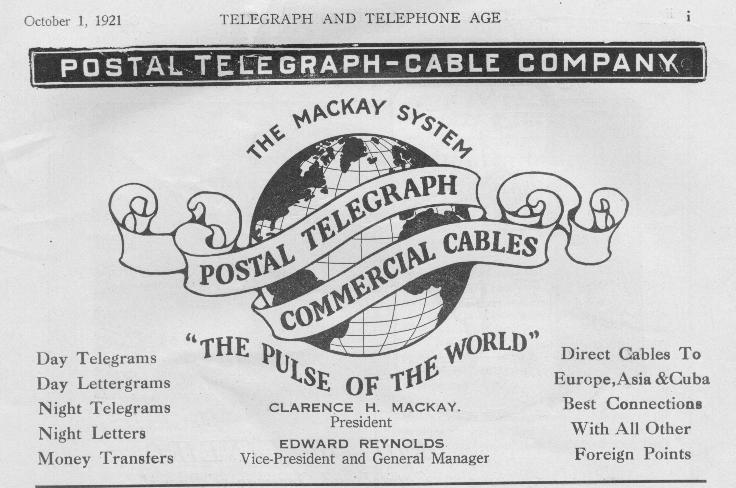
- 1921 advertisement for the Postal Telegraph-Cable Company
- Founded: 1880s
- Founder: John William Mackay
- Defunct: 1943
- Fate: consolidation with Western Union

Postal Telegraph Company (Postal Telegraph & Cable Corporation) was a major operator of telegraph networks in the United States prior to its consolidation with Western Union in 1943. Postal partnered with Commercial Cable Company for overseas cable messaging.

Postal was founded in the 1880s by John William Mackay, an entrepreneur who had made a fortune in silver mining in the Comstock Lode. Mackay's original purpose was to provide a domestic wire network to directly link with the Atlantic Cable. Mackay built the Postal network by the purchase of existing insolvent firms. The company was initially called The Pacific Postal Telegraph Cable Co. Under president Albert Brown Chandler, the Postal network was able to achieve sufficient economy of scale to compete with Western Union, occasionally controlling as much as 20% of the business.

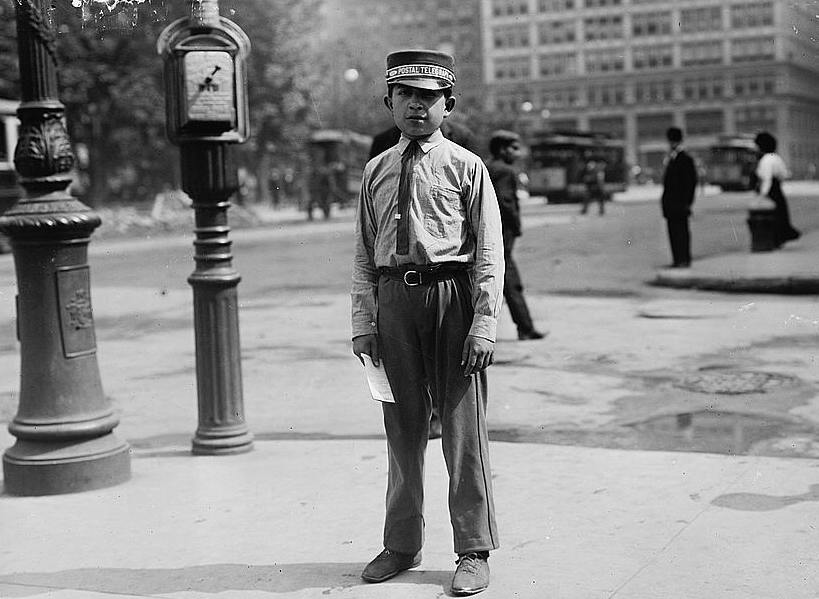
A child employee of the Postal Tel. Co. wearing a summer uniform in New York City, ca. 1912

By 1893, the company's rate of growth had allowed it to become the only viable competitor to Western Union. It had grown so large that management had to move out of the company's New York City headquarters at 187 Broadway to accommodate more operations staff. Chandler oversaw the design and construction of the Postal Telegraph Company Building, a new headquarters at 253 Broadway and Murray Street.

In the film of William Saroyan's The Human Comedy the story is mainly told through the eyes of a teenager working as a delivery boy for the Postal Telegraph Company, and some of the action takes place in the telegraph office.

== Gallery ==
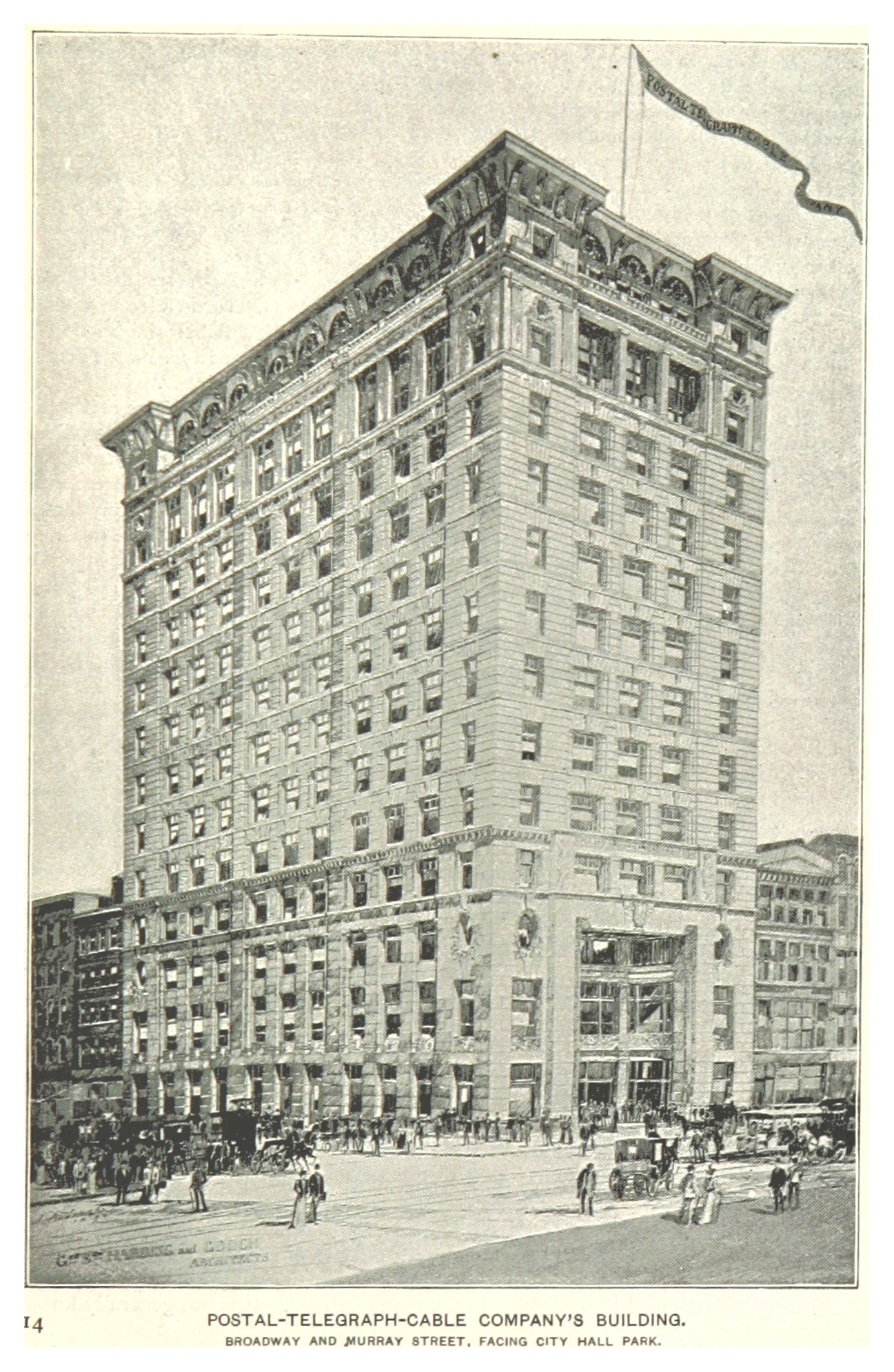
Postal Telegraph Headquarters Building, New York, 1893.

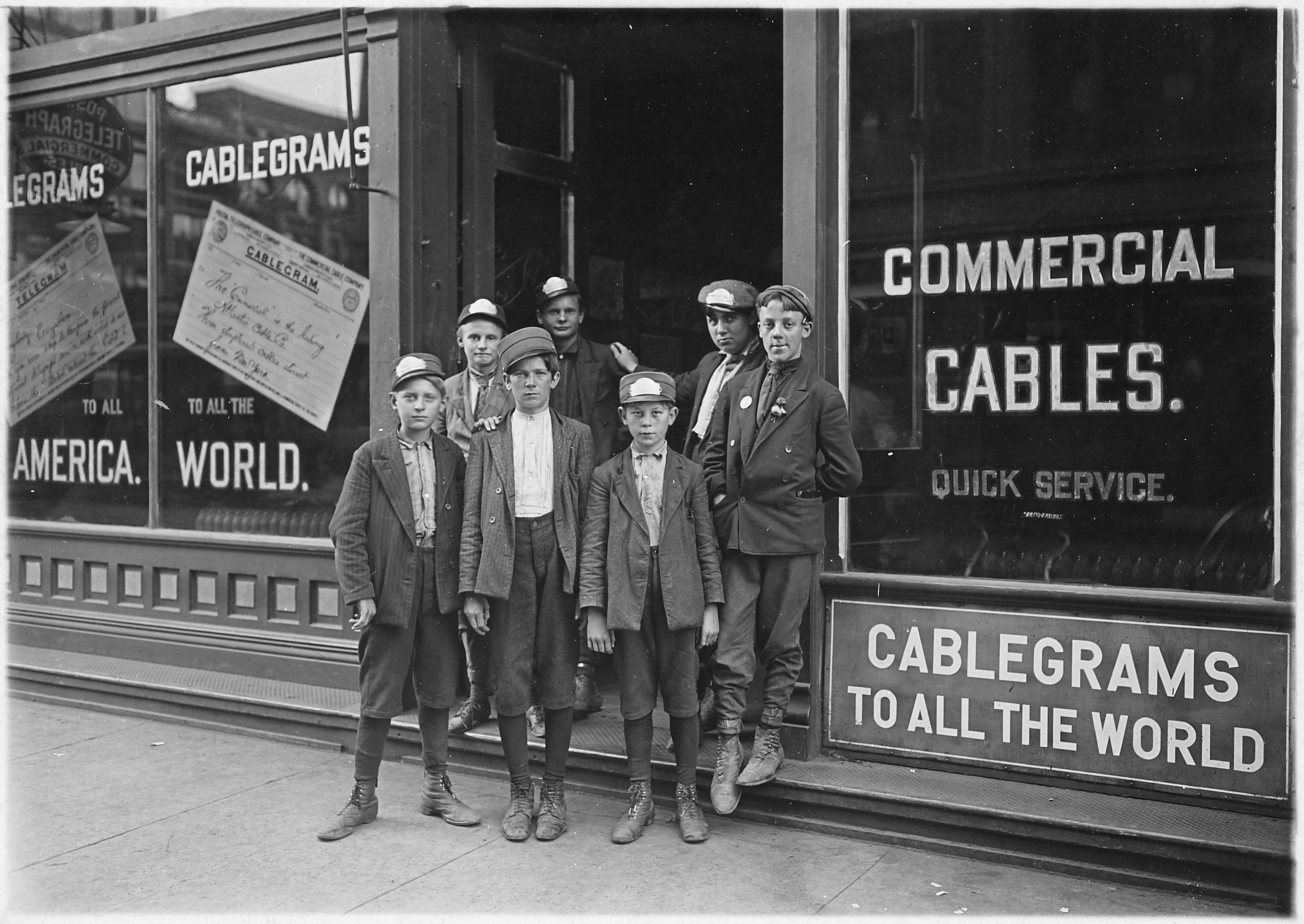
Postal Telegraph Messengers, Indianapolis, IN, 1912.

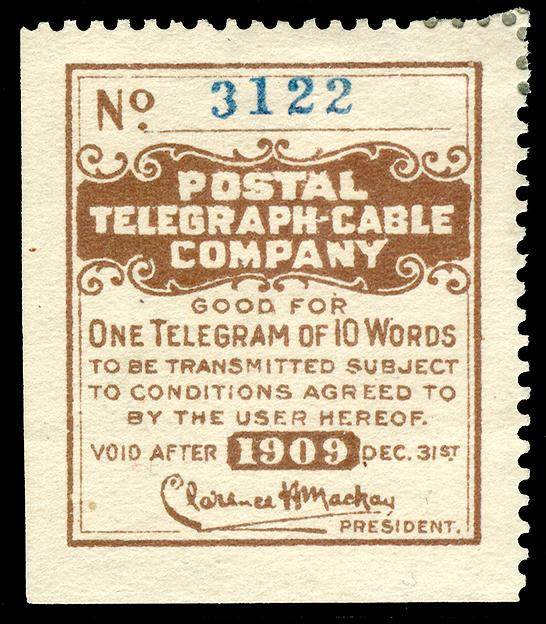
Postal Telegraph Cable Company stamp, 1909.

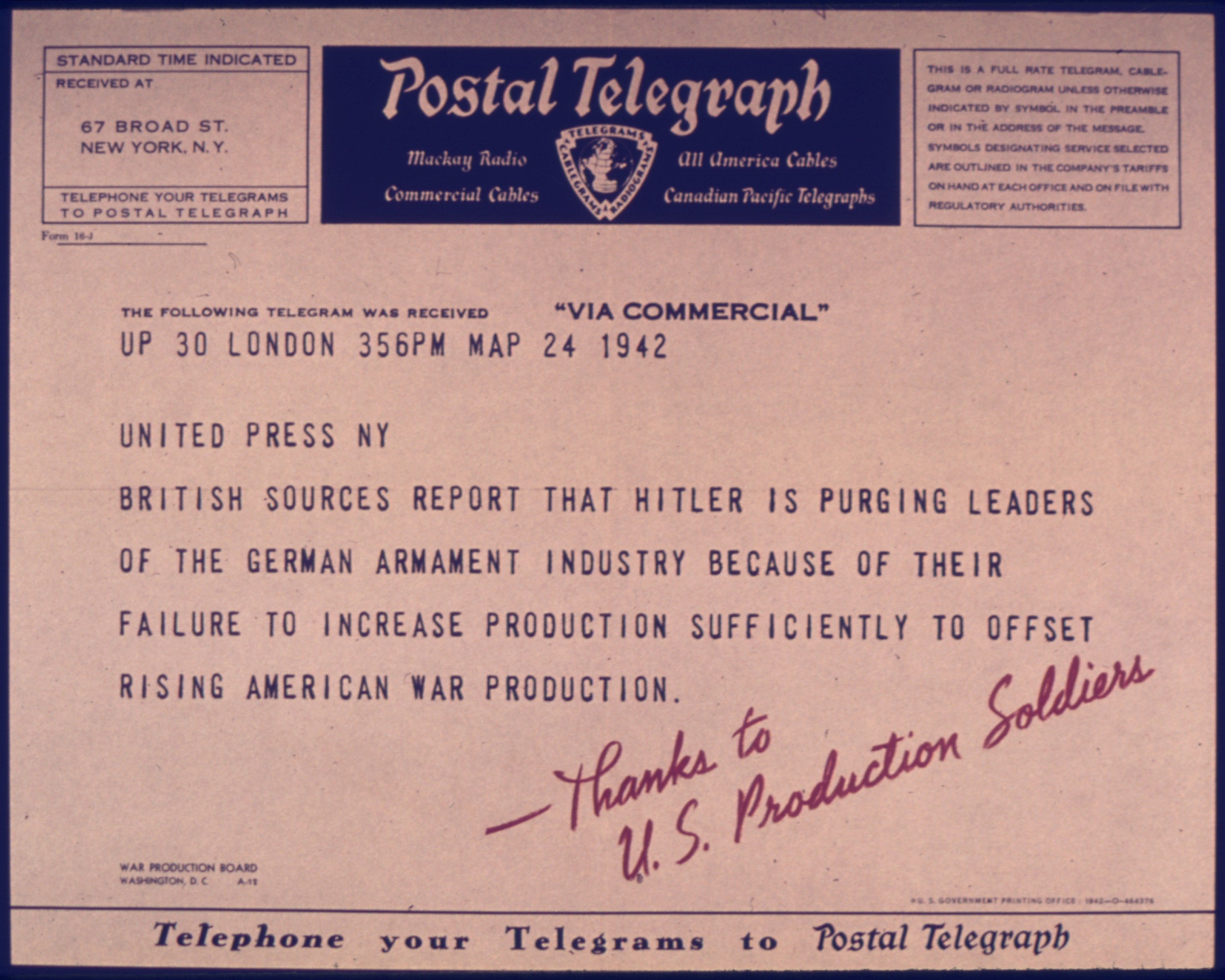
A Postal Telegram, 1942.
