= Francis Joseph McCarty =

American radio experimenter (1888–1906)

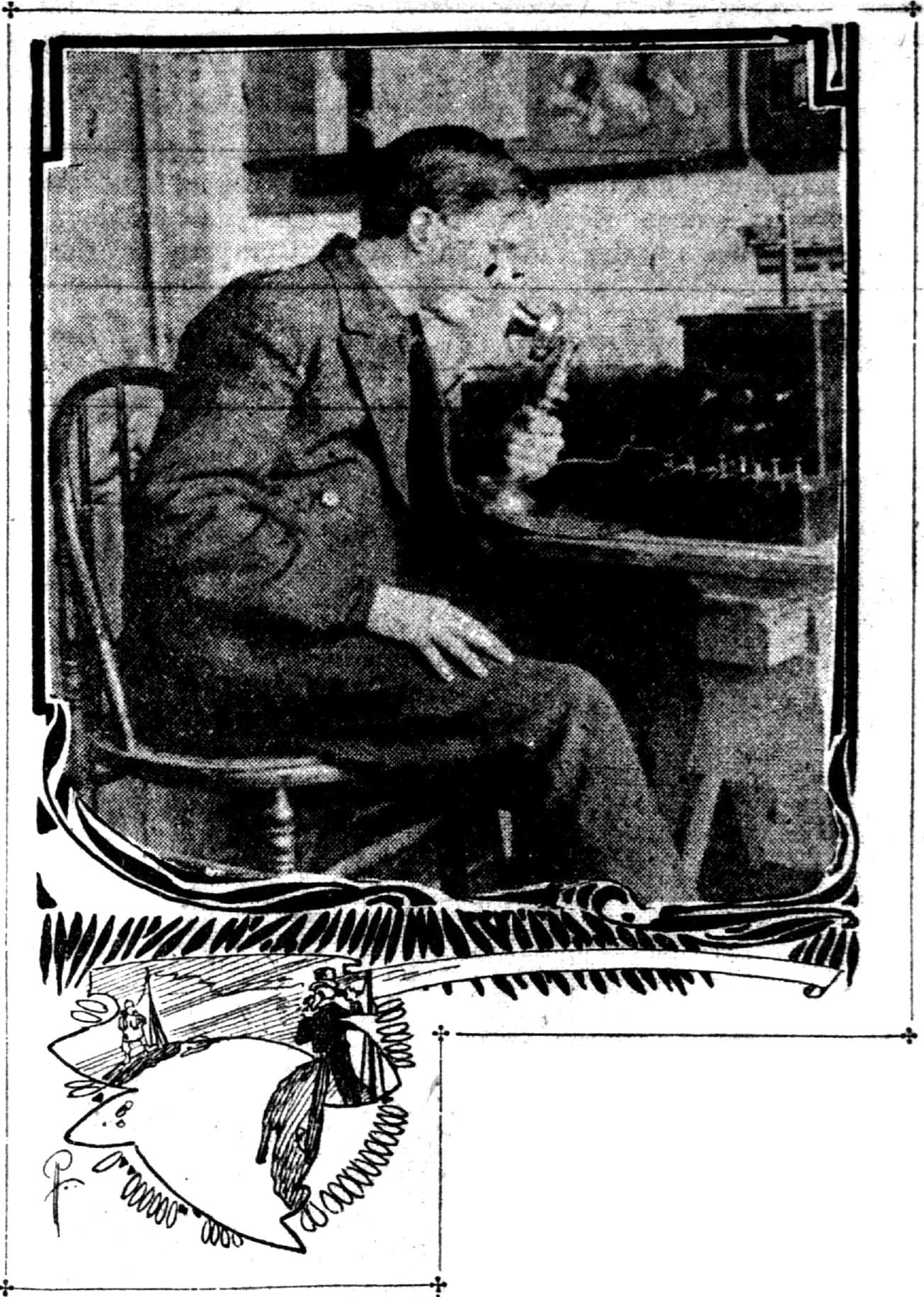
- McCarty testing his radiotelephone transmitter at the Cliff House hotel in San Francisco in October 1905
- Born: May 23, 1888; San Francisco, California, U.S.
- Died: May 11, 1906 (aged 17); Oakland, California, U.S.
- Occupation: Radio experimenter
- Family: Mary Eunice McCarthy (sister); John P. McCarthy; Henry McCarty (brothers)

Francis Joseph McCarty (May 23, 1888 – May 11, 1906) was a San Francisco experimenter, who conducted early radiotelephone research and development. He died at the age of 17, but despite his young age and early death, in 2011 he was elected into the Bay Area Radio Hall of Fame, recognized as being one of the "pioneers of broadcasting in the Bay Area".

== Biography ==
Francis Joseph McCarty was born in San Francisco, California in 1888 to John Henry McCarty and Catherine Lynch. His sister, Mary Eunice McCarthy (who used a different spelling of the family name), reported in a memoir that at the age of thirteen Francis received permission to drop out of school, having found most of the curriculum a distraction to his desire to become an inventor. With the assistance of one of the Jesuit professors at the local St. Ignatius school that he had been attending, McCarty developed his own routine of independent study. At this time radio transmissions (then commonly known as "wireless telegraphy") were limited to the dots-and-dashes of Morse code, and McCarty eventually began work toward developing a practical wireless telephone.

Initially financing himself with various jobs including clerking at a dry goods house, by 1903 he reported success in developing a radiotelephone capable of transmitting a distance of 4 miles (6 km). In 1904 The McCarty Wireless Telephone Co. was formed, and it was announced that McCarty had transferred his inventions to the company in exchange for $1,500 cash and 120,250 shares of stock. McCarty's uncle, Daniel "White Hat" McCarty, was instrumental in promoting the new company's stock.

McCarty's efforts began to gain wider notice, and he was featured in an expansive interview as "San Francisco's Boy Inventor" that appeared in the September 24, 1905, issue of the San Francisco Call, where he stated that the maximum tested range was now "between San Mateo and Millbrae, seven miles and a half" (12 km). The next month he made a successful public demonstration, sending audio from the Cliff House to Cyclers' Rest, a distance of a mile and a half (2 km). However, the ongoing lack of funds meant that there was only a single transmitter, so it was not possible to demonstrate two-way communication.

Following the April 18, 1906 San Francisco earthquake, McCarty moved his office to nearby Oakland. On the following May 8, while returning home, he was thrown from a small horse-drawn cart, breaking his jaw as well as causing severe head injuries. He died three days later at Providence Hospital, at the age of "17 years 11 months and 18 days". His brother Henry was appointed as executor of his estate, and in 1907 two U.S. patents originally applied for by Francis were granted, which described "high frequency spark" transmitters capable of making audio transmissions. His brother Ignatius made an attempt to continue the investigations, but saw little progress before abandoning additional efforts.

Following Francis McCarty's death, two of the McCarty Wireless Telephone Co. investors, bankers William and Tyler Henshaw, contacted Cyril Frank Elwell and arranged for him to review the potential worth of McCarty's patents. Elwell concluded that the system's apparatus was incapable of ever being refined enough to become an effective radiotelephone system. However, he became intrigued by the general concept of radiotelephony, and went on to organize a group of investors to license Danish inventor Valdemar Poulsen's superior "arc converter" technology, leading to the formation of the Federal Telegraph Company.

From 1910 until 1914 another brother (who also adopted a modified version of the family name), John P. McCarthy, conducted his own radiotelephone research, but ultimately decided his future was in the movie industry. Eventually the McCarty patents were acquired by the National Wireless Telephone and Telegraph Company.
