= Admiral Stone =

Admiral Stone may refer to:

- Earl E. Stone (1895–1989), U.S. Navy rear admiral
- Ellery W. Stone (1894–1981), U.S. Navy rear admiral
