= Heroes in Blue =

Heroes in Blue may refer to:

- Heroes in Blue (1939 film), an American crime film
- Heroes in Blue (1927 film), an American silent drama film
