= Haraden =

Haraden could refer to:

== People ==
- Jonathan Haraden (1744–1803), American privateer
- Haraden Pratt (1891–1969), American electrical engineer

== Ships ==
- USS Haraden (DD-183), a destroyer from 1918 to 1945
- USS Haraden (DD-585), a destroyer from 1943 to 1973
