= Wanted by the Police =

- Theatrical release poster
- Directed by: Howard Bretherton
- Screenplay by: Wellyn Totman
- Story by: Donn O'Mullally; Sally Sandlin
- Produced by: Lindsley Parsons
- Starring: Frankie Darro; Evalyn Knapp; Robert Kent; Matty Fain; Lillian Elliott; Don Rowan
- Cinematography: Bert Longenecker
- Production company: Monogram Pictures
- Distributed by: Monogram Pictures
- Release date: September 21, 1938
- Running time: 59 minutes
- Country: United States
- Language: English

Wanted by the Police is a 1938 American crime film directed by Howard Bretherton and written by Wellyn Totman. The film stars Frankie Darro, Evalyn Knapp, Robert Kent, Matty Fain, Lillian Elliott and Don Rowan. The film was released on September 21, 1938, by Monogram Pictures.

== Cast ==
- Frankie Darro as Danny Murphy
- Evalyn Knapp as Kathleen Murphy
- Robert Kent as Mike O'Leary
- Matty Fain as Williams
- Lillian Elliott as Mrs. Murphy
- Don Rowan as Owens
- Sam Bernard as Stringer
- Mauritz Hugo as Marty
- Walter Merrill as Trigger
- Ralph Peters as Jess
- Thelma White as Lillian
- Willy Castello as Russo
