= Cyril Frank Elwell =

American inventor and pioneer in development of radio

Cyril Elwell
- Born: Cyril Frank Elwell; August 20, 1884; Australia
- Died: February 11, 1963 (aged 78); Belmont, California, United States

Cyril Frank Elwell (August 20, 1884 – February 11, 1963) was an Australian-born American inventor and pioneer in development of radio.

He had an American father and a German mother, then went to Fort St. Model Public School in Sydney, Australia.

Elwell arrived in the United States in 1902. He applied to Stanford University and entered the electrical engineering program there. In 1906, he organized fellow students to participate in repairs at the campus, owing to the San Francisco earthquake. He graduated in 1907. He founded the Poulsen Wireless Telephone and Telegraph Company, later renamed Federal Telegraph Company in 1909.

Elwell designed a large transformer for electric arc furnace reduction of iron ore; this became the topic of his thesis. He had published some technical papers on applications in electric metallurgy. In 1908 he switched interests to wireless communication after investigating a system for voice transmission by spark gap transmitter invented by Francis Joseph McCarty (1888-1906) in 1902. After demonstrating the concept and obtaining financial backing for further research, McCarty had been killed in an automobile accident. His investors had contacted Harris J. Ryan at Stanford, who referred them to Elwell. The apparatus Elwell had evaluated proved unsuitable, but he knew of the Poulsen arc converter, which differed from the spark gap in producing a continuous wave. This, Elwell knew, would be more suitable for wireless transmission of voice.

By 1910 Elwell had demonstrated voice communication between Stockton and Sacramento, California. Equipment and technique rapidly improved and by 1911 Federal Telegraph was prepared to bid on contracts to provide Navy communication to Hawaii. After a dispute with the board of directors, Elwell resigned from Federal Telegraph in 1913 but continued radio research, joining the short-lived Universal Radio Syndicate. During World War I, he was a consulting radio engineer for the French and Italian governments. Between 1915 and 1923, he was the managing director of 'C. F. Elwell, Ltd.' In June 1924, renowned Scottish inventor and television pioneer John Logie Baird bought from Elwell a thallium sulphide (thalofide) cell, developed by Theodore Case in the USA. The thalofide cell was part of the important new technology of 'talking pictures', i.e. Phonofilm. Elwell was one of the founders of the Mullard company, manufacturers of vacuum tubes. After his term as director at Mullard, he returned to the United States in 1947 and was a consulting engineer for Hewlett Packard. He died in 1963 and is buried in Palo Alto.
