= American Cable and Radio Corporation =

- Company type: Subsidiary
- Founded: February 1940; 85 years ago

American Cable and Radio Corporation was a communications holding company in the middle 20th century. Created in February 1940, it was a part of ITT World Communications, and operated what was known as the American Cable and Radio System, comprising All America Cables and Radio, the Commercial Cable Company, Mackay Radio, and the Sociedad Anonima Radio Argentina.

The company was created, along with the All America Corporation and the Commercial Mackay Corporation, after the reorganization of the ITT subsidiary Postal Telegraph and Cable Corporation, which had gone into bankruptcy in 1935. The firm was active in the 1940s and 1950s. Warren Lee Pierson, the wartime head of the Export-Import Bank, became the firm's president after the war. Kenneth Evans Stockton was elected president in March 1948 and served until his death in 1950. Famed admiral William Halsey Jr. was the chairman of the board after 1949. Rear Admiral Ellery W. Stone, USN (retired), was president of the firm from 1950 to 1958. Another prominent electrical engineer, Haraden Pratt, was vice president from 1953 to 1958. James R. McNitt, a former United States Air Force brigadier general, was named president in 1964. The company was still in existence as late as 1980.
