= Mary Eunice McCarthy =

American screenwriter and playwright (1899–1969)

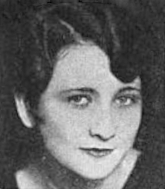
- Born: March 4, 1899; San Francisco, California, US
- Died: August 7, 1969 (aged 70); North Hollywood, California, US
- Occupations: Screenwriter, journalist, playwright, author
- Years active: 1920–1963
- Spouse: Edward G. Boyle
- Family: John P. McCarthy; Francis Joseph McCarty; Henry McCarty (brothers)

Mary Eunice McCarthy (March 4, 1899 – August 7, 1969) was an American screenwriter, playwright, journalist and author, perhaps best known today as the screenwriter of, and driving force behind, the biopic Sister Kenny (1946).

== Biography ==
=== Beginnings ===
One of 13 children born to John Henry McCarty and Catherine Elizabeth Theresa Lynch, Mary graduated from Star of the Sea Parish High School in 1917. She then attended College of the Holy Names before embarking on a career as a journalist in the Bay Area. One of her positions in the early 1920s was as a reporter at The San Francisco Bulletin.

=== Hollywood career ===
Around 1921, McCarthy followed her brothers to Hollywood, where she worked at an advertising agency while trying to teach herself the fundamentals of screenwriting. Between 1925 and 1957, she wrote a number of films and at least two stage plays—the latter of which also featured the playwright, under her married name Mary Boyle, in the lead role. During this period, McCarthy lived in Los Angeles but frequently traveled to San Francisco for work. McCarthy also wrote two nonfiction books: Hands of Hollywood was published in 1929, while Meet Kitty (a memoir about her mother) was published in 1957. That same year, both Matinee Theater and O. Henry Playhouse featured new McCarthy teleplays.

In 1939, a syndicated profile/interview highlighted McCarthy's "pet dislike at present," paraphrased by UP's Alex Kahn as "the so-called Hollywood 'Intellectuals' who, she says, try so hard to be different and become so utterly confused." Quoted directly, McCarthy continues:

What they need to do is to look more closely at the fundamentals of American life, sympathetically, not with intent to "commit a message."

Aside from foreshadowing the anti-message 'message' of Preston Sturges's Sullivan's Travels, McCarthy's gripe also sheds light on a script she had recently completed and another she would soon begin, namely Irish Luck (1939) and Chasing Trouble (1940), vehicles designed for the newly minted, interracial comic team of Mantan Moreland and Frankie Darro (the latter having previously been singled out for praise in McCarthy's Hands of Hollywood). Despite playing the duo's nominal leader, Darro's leadership is typically so compromised by harebrained schemes and arcane, questionable methodology—in effect, "try[ing] so hard to be different"—that he can scarcely help but "become utterly confused." Moreover, while it is unclear to what extent, if any, she herself was responsible for the Moreland-Darro pairing, the following excerpts from McCarthy's 1957 biography of her mother provides a useful reference point, regarding "the fundamentals of American life" as practiced and preached in the McCarty/McCarthy household.

"I don't like the word tolerance. It sounds stuck up". It was a little old lady speaking, very little and quite old. Her name was Kitty, and she was my mother. "There ain't any respect in tolerating," she continued, the blue of her eyes grown darker with indignation. "That's just putting up with them, like with bad plumbing when you can't afford to move..." [...] She did not "tolerate" the Negro or the Asiatic, the Protestant or the Jew, despite their racial or religious difference. Instead, she respected every human being equally, because she thought Thomas Jefferson had meant every word of the Declaration.

Reviewing Meet Kitty for The New York Times, Ernestine Gilbreth Carey wrote:

What lasting impact does a mother make on her daughter's mind and heart? In her first book, [McCarthy] has chosen to answer this question with gusto and courage. [...] Through no quirk of chance the writer highlights her mother against a panorama of beautiful, bustling San Francisco rather than of kitchen, washtub, nursery and parlor. By the time Mary was 6 years old, five of Kitty's children had died; within another few years an unusually gifted son followed them. Meanwhile additional sorrow had developed when Kitty's scamp of a husband deserted her, leaving no financial support. [...] In spite of such undertones, this account is predominantly gay, nostalgic and alive with humor. Yet its canvas and colors seem stretched thin occasionally. For when the seething chemistry of inter-family relationships is bottled up for obvious reasons, even San Francisco with its colorful history and humanity can't substitute. Nevertheless, Miss McCarthy has given us a delightful portrait—one which is sure to be warmly welcomed and enjoyed.

In October 1958, McCarthy would briefly resume her journalistic career as author of a weekly column published in the West Los Angeles Independent. It ran for a little under three years and was entitled simply "Mary McCarthy's Column". But, as her new employer noted prior to the column's debut, "Anything more pretentious would offend Mary Eunice McCarthy."

=== Personal life ===
She had two brothers who were writer-directors in the industry: John P. McCarthy and Henry McCarty. Another brother, Francis Joseph McCarty, built one of the first radiotelephone sets in 1902, but died in a road accident in 1906. From January 1922 until at least July 1931, McCarthy was married to Edward G. Boyle, a set decorator.

In the weeks leading up to the 1928 presidential election, McCarthy—dubbed "the Joan of Arc of the Democratic Party"—harshly criticized the Hoover presidency and campaigned on behalf of his Democratic opponent, Al Smith.

The dedicatee of her 1929 film-making guide, Hands of Hollywood, was longtime friend and colleague Lucy Beaumont, who had starred in at least two McCarthy-scripted films.

Dedicated
to
Lucy Beaumont
DISTINGUISHED ACTRESS,
ALWAYS STARRED IN
THE ROLE OF MY FRIEND

'Tis thanking you, we are, for being so
small—you fit the heart so snug.

== Selected filmography ==
- Hill Folk (a.k.a. Savage Passions) (1926)
- The Fighting Failure (1926)
- Slightly Married (1932, as Mary McCarthy)
- Ships of Chance (1932, never filmed)
- Woman Unafraid (1934, story and screenplay)
- I Hate Women (1934, screenplay)
- Life Returns (1934, additional dialogue; as Mary McCarthy)
- Theodora Goes Wild (1935, story; as Mary McCarthy)
- Irish Luck (1939, as Mary McCarthy)
- Chasing Trouble (1940, as Mary McCarthy)
- Sister Kenny (1946, as Mary McCarthy)
- Curley (1947, additional dialogue; as Mary McCarthy)
- The Petty Girl (1950, story; as Mary McCarthy)
