= Lillian Elliott =

Canadian actress

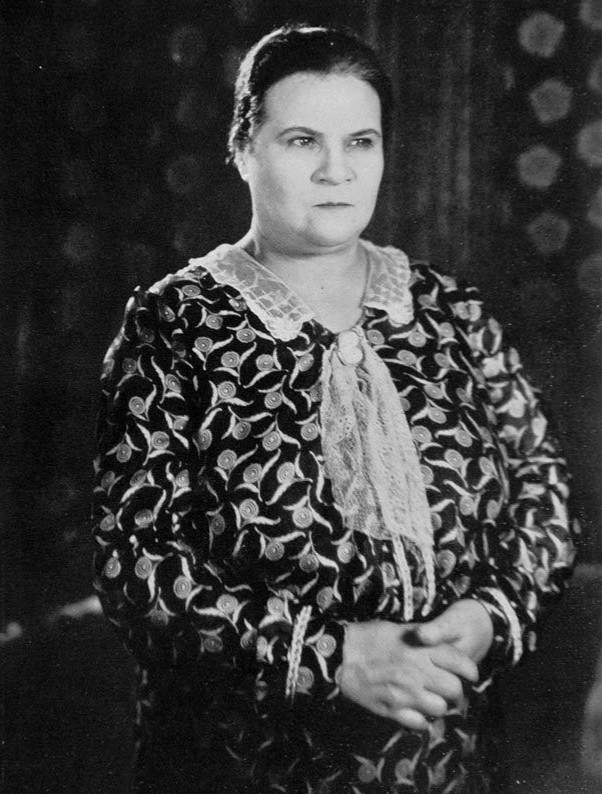
- Elliott in 1930.
- Born: Lillian Hiby; 24 April 1874; Canada
- Died: 15 January 1959 (aged 84); Hollywood, California, U.S.
- Other names: Lillian Corrigan, Lillian Hiby Corrigan
- Occupation: Actress
- Years active: 1915–1943
- Spouse: James Corrigan (m. 1899)
- Children: Lloyd Corrigan

Lillian Elliott (24 April 1874 – 15 January 1959) was a stage and film actress, appearing in 60 films between 1915 and 1943. She was born in Canada.

Elliott's work on stage included acting in the Burbank and Morosco theaters in Los Angeles, California. Her Broadway credits included Hanky Panky (1912) and The Pleasure Seekers (1913).

She married actor James Corrigan on 10 July 1899, in San Francisco, California and their eldest son, Lloyd Corrigan, became a Hollywood writer, director, and character actor. She died in Hollywood, California.

== Partial filmography ==
- Help Wanted (1915) - Mrs. Meyers
- Lavender and Old Lace (1921) - Jane Hathaway
- Too Much Married (1921) - Mrs. Peter Gulp
- The Chorus Lady (1924) - Mrs. Patrick O'Brien
- One Glorious Night (1924) - Mrs. Clark
- Proud Flesh (1925) - Mrs. Casey
- Old Clothes (1925) - Nathan's Mother
- Sally, Irene and Mary (1938) - Mrs. O'Dare
- Partners Again (1926) - Rosie Potash
- The Volga Boatman (1926) - Landlady (uncredited)
- The Family Upstairs (1926) - Emma Heller
- The City (1926) - Mrs. Elliott
- Ankles Preferred (1927) - Mrs. Goldberg
- The King of Kings (1927) - (uncredited)
- Call of the Cuckoo (1927, Short) - Mama Gimplewart
- The Swellhead (1930) - Mrs. Callahan
- Song o' My Heart (1930) - Irish Woman (uncredited)
- Liliom (1930) - Aunt Hulda
- Her Wedding Night (1930) - Mrs. Marshall
- The Single Sin (1931) - Cook
- The Spy (1931) - Minor Role
- Broken Lullaby (1932) - Frau Bresslauer (uncredited)
- Free Eats (1932, Short) - Mrs. Stanford L. Clark
- Polly of the Circus (1932) - Mrs. McNamara
- Sinners in the Sun (1932) - Jimmie's Landlady (uncredited)
- Evenings for Sale (1932) - Frau Meyer (uncredited)
- A Bedtime Story (1933) - Aristide's Wife
- The Trumpet Blows (1934) - Senora Ramirez
- One More River (1934) - Flower Woman (uncredited)
- Mrs. Wiggs of the Cabbage Patch (1934) - Mrs. Bagby
- A Wicked Woman (1934) - Mrs. Johnson (uncredited)
- Helldorado (1935) - Elsie's Mother (uncredited)
- The Casino Murder Case (1935) - Mrs. Marting (uncredited)
- Alias Mary Dow (1935) - Orphan Matron (uncredited)
- Just My Luck (1935) - Mrs. Riley - Landlady
- Green Light (1937) - Mrs. Crandall - Harcourt's Housekeeper (uncredited)
- Jim Hanvey, Detective (1937) - Society Woman (uncredited)
- The Jury's Secret (1938) - Mrs. Muller (uncredited)
- The Chaser (1938) - Prison Matron (uncredited)
- Wanted by the Police (1938) - Mrs. Murphy
- Service de Luxe (1938) - Small Towner (uncredited)
- Tough Kid (1938) - Katie Murphy
- Society Lawyer (1939) - Durant's Cook (uncredited)
- Boys' Reformatory (1939) - Mrs. O'Meara
- When Tomorrow Comes (1939) - Character Woman (uncredited)
- Irish Luck (1939) - Mrs. O'Brien
- Heroes in Blue (1939) - Mrs. Murphy
- Emergency Squad (1940) - Landlady (uncredited)
- Chasing Trouble (1940) - Mrs. O'Brien
- Women Without Names (1940) - Mrs. Anthony (uncredited)
- On the Spot (1940) - Mrs. Kelly
- Laughing at Danger (1940) - Mrs. Kelly
- Road to Happiness (1941) - Mrs. Price
- Gangway for Tomorrow (1943) - Burke's Mother (uncredited)
