= Chasing Trouble =

1940 film

- Directed by: Howard Bretherton
- Screenplay by: Mary McCarthy
- Produced by: Grant Withers
- Cinematography: Harry Neumann
- Edited by: Carl Pierson
- Distributed by: Monogram Pictures
- Release date: 30 January 1940
- Running time: 64 minutes
- Country: United States
- Language: English

Chasing Trouble is a 1940 American comedy-drama film directed by Howard Bretherton, from Monogram Pictures.

== Plot ==
Frankie Darro and Mantan Moreland in Chasing Trouble (1940)

Jimmy "Mr. Cupid" O’Brien and Thomas H. Jefferson are making deliveries for the local florist and manage to get a job for their unemployed friend, Susie Carey.

They are unaware that the proprietor, Mr. Morgan, is part of a spy and saboteur ring which is using the florist shop as a front for delivering coded messages and bombs.

Using lesson two of his correspondence course on graphology, Jimmy learns the truth but it might be too late for intrepid investigative reporter Callahan and the police to help them before the bomb they are supposed to deliver goes off at an airplane factory.

Milburn Stone with Marjorie Reynolds, in Chasing Trouble (1940)

== Cast ==
- Frankie Darro as Jimmy 'Cupid' O'Brien
- Mantan Moreland as Jefferson
- Marjorie Reynolds as Susie
- Milburn Stone as Callahan
- Cheryl Walker as Phyllis Benton
- George Cleveland as Lester
- Alex Callam as Morgan
- Tristram Coffin as Phillips
- I. Stanford Jolley as Molotoff
- Lillian Elliott as Mrs. O'Brien
- Willy Castello as Kurt
- Donald Kerr as Cassidy
