= Tough Kid =

- Theatrical release poster
- Directed by: Howard Bretherton
- Screenplay by: Wellyn Totman
- Story by: Brenda Weisberg
- Produced by: Lindsley Parsons
- Starring: Frankie Darro; Dick Purcell; Judith Allen; Lillian Elliott; Don Rowan; William Ruhl
- Cinematography: Harry Neumann
- Edited by: Russell F. Schoengarth
- Production company: Monogram Pictures
- Distributed by: Monogram Pictures
- Release date: December 28, 1938
- Running time: 59 minutes
- Country: United States
- Language: English

Tough Kid is a 1938 American crime film directed by Howard Bretherton and written by Wellyn Totman. The film stars Frankie Darro, Dick Purcell, Judith Allen, Lillian Elliott, Don Rowan and William Ruhl. The film was released on December 28, 1938, by Monogram Pictures.

== Plot ==
Skipper Murphy helps train his brother Red for a championship fight. However, a gang of gamblers tries to blackmail Red into losing by kidnapping his fiancée Ruth Lane.

== Cast ==
- Frankie Darro as Skipper Murphy
- Dick Purcell as Red Murphy
- Judith Allen as Ruth Lane
- Lillian Elliott as Katie Murphy
- Don Rowan as Bill Grogan
- William Ruhl as Monk
- Lew Kelly as Regan
- Ralph Peters as Blackie
- Max Marx as Britt
- Jean Joyce as Miss Grace
- Cliff Howell as Radio Commentator
- Joe Lynch as Krause
- Wilbur Mack as Doc Radford
