= Irish Luck (1939 film) =

1939 film

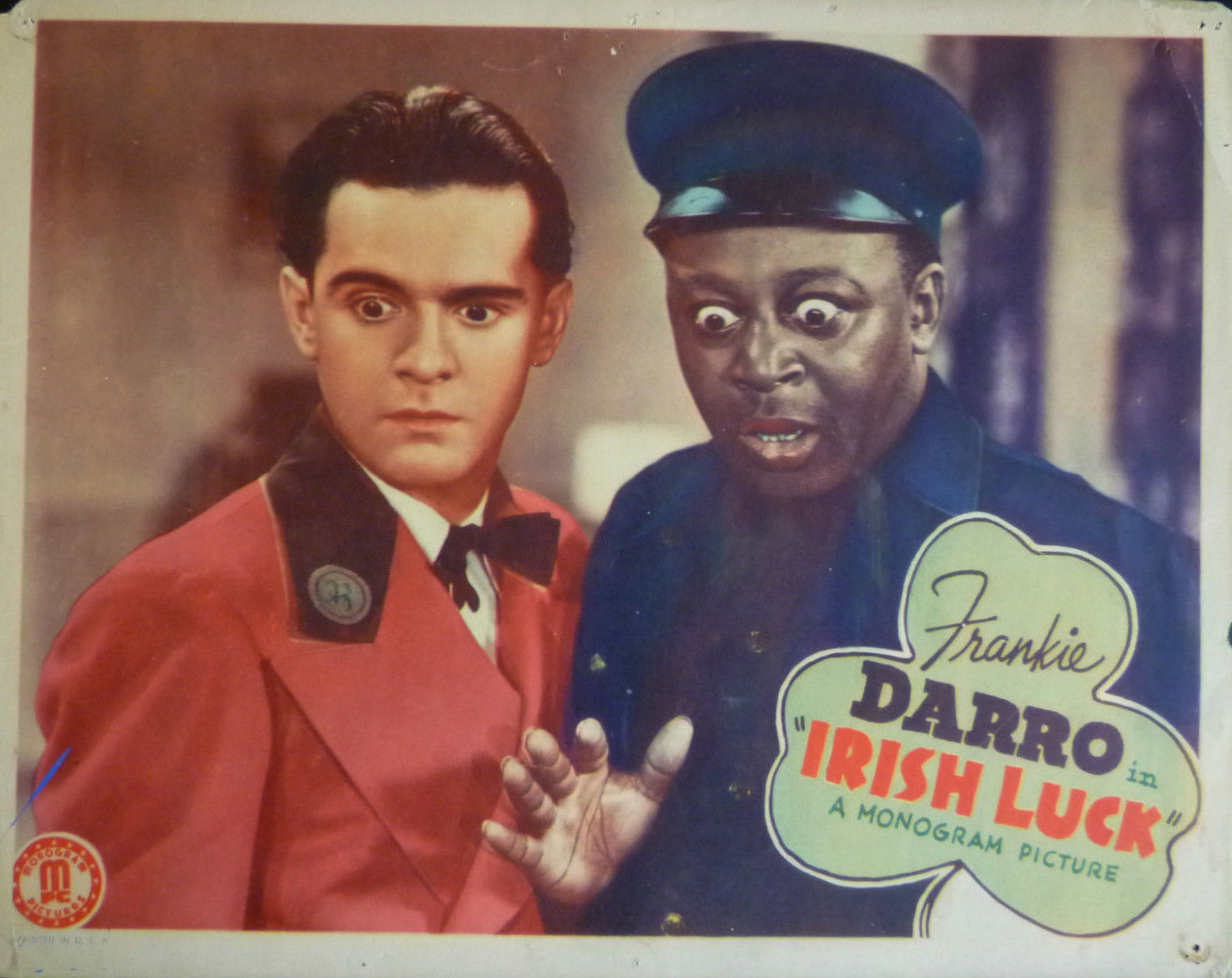
- Lobby card
- Directed by: Howard Bretherton
- Written by: Charles M. Brown (story); Mary McCarthy (screenplay)
- Produced by: Scott R. Dunlap (supervising producer); Grant Withers (associate producer)
- Starring: See below
- Cinematography: Harry Neumann
- Edited by: Russell F. Schoengarth
- Music by: Edward J. Kay
- Release date: August 22, 1939
- Running time: 58 minutes
- Country: United States
- Language: English

Irish Luck is a 1939 American comedy adventure film directed by Howard Bretherton.

The film is also known as Amateur Detective in the United Kingdom.

== Cast ==
- Frankie Darro as Buzzy O'Brien
- Dick Purcell as Steve Lanahan
- Lillian Elliott as Mrs. O'Brien
- Dennis Moore as Jim Monahan
- James Flavin as Hotel Detective Fluger
- Sheila Darcy as Kitty Monahan
- Mantan Moreland as Jefferson
- Ralph Peters as Detective Jenkins
- Tristram Coffin as Mr. Mace - Hotel Desk Clerk
- Pat Gleason as Banning - Bond Robber
- Gene O'Donnell as Bond Robber
- Donald Kerr as Reporter
- Howard M. Mitchell as Hotel Manager
- Aloha Wray as Dancer
