= Dick Purcell =

American actor (1905–1944)

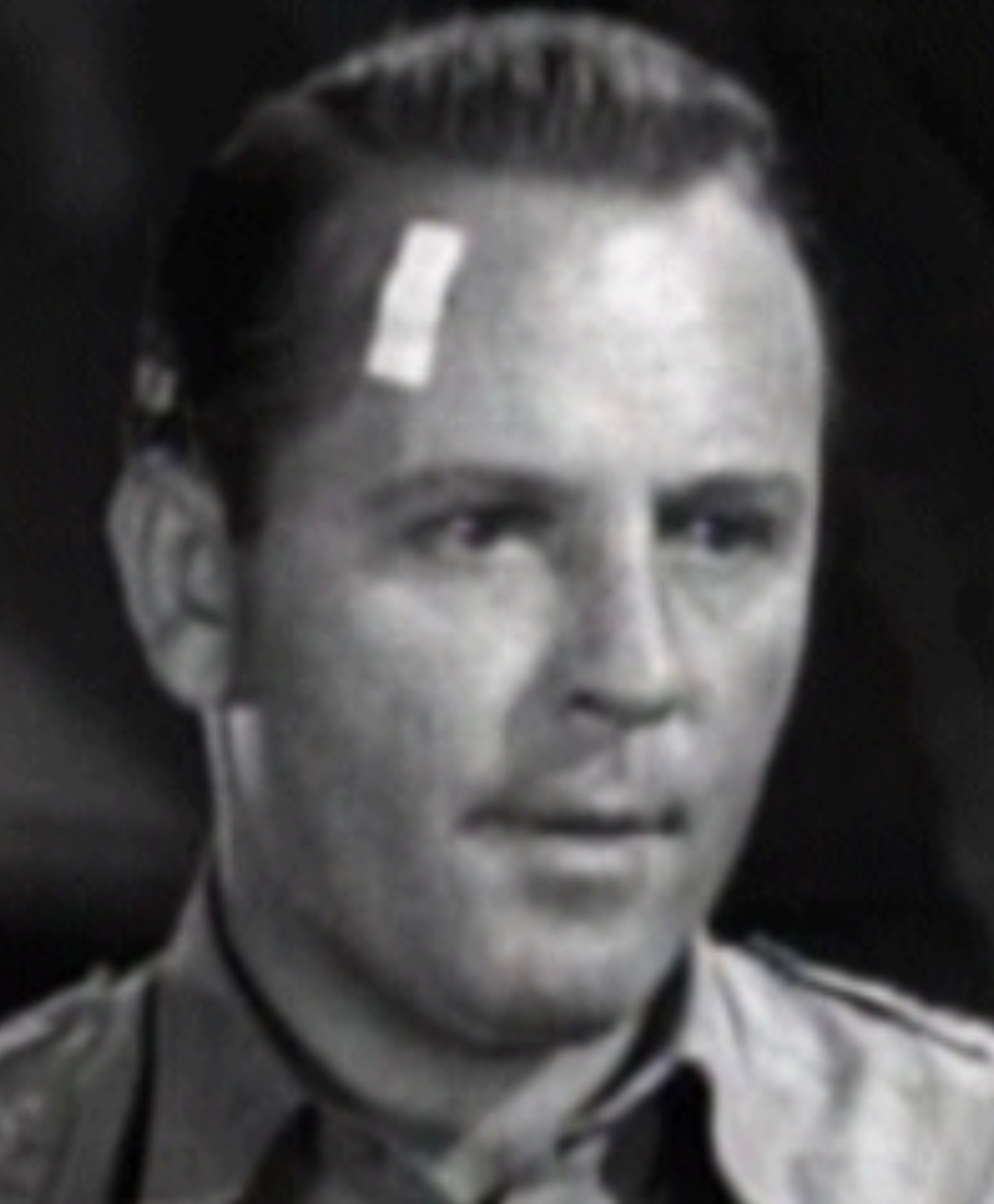
- Purcell in King of the Zombies (1941)
- Born: Richard Gerold Purcell Jr. August 6, 1905; Greenwich, Connecticut, U.S.
- Died: April 10, 1944 (aged 38); Hollywood, California, U.S.
- Education: Fordham University
- Occupation: Actor
- Years active: 1914–1944
- Employer: Warner Brothers
- Known for: Captain America
- Spouse: Ethelind Terry (m. 1942; div. 1942)

Richard Gerold Purcell Jr. (August 6, 1905 – April 10, 1944) was an American actor best known for playing Marvel Comics' Captain America in the 1944 film serial, co-starring with Lorna Gray and Lionel Atwill. Purcell also appeared in films such as Tough Kid (1938), Accidents Will Happen (1938), Heroes in Blue (1939), Irish Luck (1939), The Bank Dick (1940), and King of the Zombies (1941).

== Early life ==
Purcell was born in Greenwich, Connecticut in 1905 (not 1908, as many sources suggest). One of 5 children, he attended Catholic grade school and high school, before enrolling as a student at Fordham University in The Bronx in New York City.

== Career ==
Purcell began his acting career on the stage in New York, appearing in at least three plays: Men in White, Sailor, Beware! and Paths of Glory. A talent scout saw Purcell's performance in Paths of Glory which led to a small role in the film Ceiling Zero (1936). In his next film, Man Hunt (1936), Purcell had a larger role as a newspaper reporter. Purcell appeared in eleven films in 1936 alone.

=== Captain America serial ===
Purcell got the title role in the 1944 Republic serial film Captain America despite being somewhat overweight. The script was loosely based on the comic book character Captain America. The serial has Captain America, whose everyday identity is District Attorney Grant Gardner, thwarting the attempts of The Scarab, the villainous alter ego of museum curator Dr. Cyrus Maldor, to acquire a pair of super weapon devices, the "Dynamic Vibrator" and "Electronic Firebolt".

The serial, which would go on to be box office success, would be Republic's most expensive to make but also its last one about a superhero.

== Personal life ==
Purcell eloped to Las Vegas with the actress Ethelind Terry. The two married on March 3, 1942, only to divorce on August 26, 1942.

== Death ==
Shortly after he completed the Captain America film serial, and just before its general release, Purcell collapsed and died in the locker room of a Hollywood country club on 10 April 1944, shortly after playing a round of golf. His remains were interred at Holy Cross Cemetery, Culver City. Film historian Raymond Stedman speculated that the strain of filming Captain America was too much for his heart.

== Selected filmography ==
- The Doorway to Hell (1930) - Minor Role (uncredited)
- The Strange Love of Molly Louvain (1932) - Jimmy's College Friend (uncredited)
- Ceiling Zero (1936) - Smiley
- Freshman Love (1936) - Radio Announcer (uncredited)
- Man Hunt (1936) - Skip McHenry
- Brides Are Like That (1936) - Dr. Randolph Jenkins
- Snowed Under (1936) - Bert (uncredited)
- Times Square Playboy (1936) - Wally Calhoun
- The Law in Her Hands (1936) - Marty
- Bullets or Ballots (1936) - Ed Driscoll (credited as Richard Purcell)
- Public Enemy's Wife (1936) - Louie
- Bengal Tiger (1936) - Nick DeLargo
- Jailbreak (1936) - Ed Slayden
- The Case of the Velvet Claws (1936) - Crandal
- The Captain's Kid (1936) - George Chester
- King of Hockey (1936) - Gabby Dugan
- Navy Blues (1937) - Russell J. 'Rusty' Gibbs
- Men in Exile (1937) - Jimmy Carmody
- Melody for Two (1937) - Mel Lynch
- Draegerman Courage (1937) - Trapped Draegerman (uncredited)
- Slim (1937) - Tom
- Public Wedding (1937) - Joe Taylor
- Reported Missing (1937) - Paul Wayne
- Wine, Women and Horses (1937) - George Mayhew
- Alcatraz Island (1937) - 'Harp' Santell
- Missing Witnesses (1937) - 'Bull' Regan
- Daredevil Drivers (1938) - Bill Foster
- Over the Wall (1938) - Ace Scanlon
- Accidents Will Happen (1938) - Jim Faber
- Flight into Nowhere (1938) - Bill Kellogg
- Air Devils (1938) - Percy 'Slats' Harrington
- Mystery House (1938) - Lance O'Leary
- Penrod's Double Trouble (1938) - Tex Boyden
- Valley of the Giants (1938) - Creel
- Garden of the Moon (1938) - Rick Fulton
- Broadway Musketeers (1938) - Vincent 'Vince' Morrell
- Nancy Drew... Detective (1938) - Keiffer
- Tough Kid (1938) - 'Red' Murphy
- Blackwell's Island (1939) - Terry Walsh
- Streets of New York (1939) - T.P. 'Tap' Keenan
- Irish Luck (1939) - Steve Lanahan
- Heroes in Blue (1939) - Terry Murphy
- Outside the Three-Mile Limit (1940) - Agent Melvin Pierce
- New Moon (1940) - Alexander
- Private Affairs (1940) - Dick Cartwright
- Arise, My Love (1940) - Pink
- The Bank Dick (1940) - Mackley Q. Greene
- Flight Command (1940) - Lieut. 'Stichy' Payne
- King of the Zombies (1941) - James McCarthy
- Two in a Taxi (1941) - Bill Gratton
- Bullets for O'Hara (1941) - Wicks
- Flying Blind (1941) - Bob Fuller
- The Pittsburgh Kid (1941) - Cliff Halliday
- No Hands on the Clock (1941) - Red Harris
- Torpedo Boat (1942) - Ralph Andrews
- In Old California (1942) - Joe Dawson
- I Live on Danger (1942) - Norm Thompson
- The Old Homestead (1942) - Scarf Lennin
- Phantom Killer (1942) - Edward Arlington Clark
- X Marks the Spot (1942) - Police Lt. William 'Bill' Decker
- Reveille with Beverly (1943) - Andy Adams
- No Place for a Lady (1943) - Rand Brooke
- Idaho (1943) - Duke Springer
- Aerial Gunner (1943) - Pvt. Lancelot 'Gadget' Blaine
- High Explosive (1943) - Dave
- Mystery of the 13th Guest (1943) - Johnny Smith
- Timber Queen (1944) - Milt Holmes
- Captain America (1944, Serial) - Grant Gardner / Captain America (posthumous credit re-released in 1953)
- Trocadero (1944) - Spike Nelson (posthumous release)
- Leave It to the Irish (1944) - Pat Burke (final film role, posthumous release)
