= Peder Oluf Pedersen =

Danish engineer and physicist

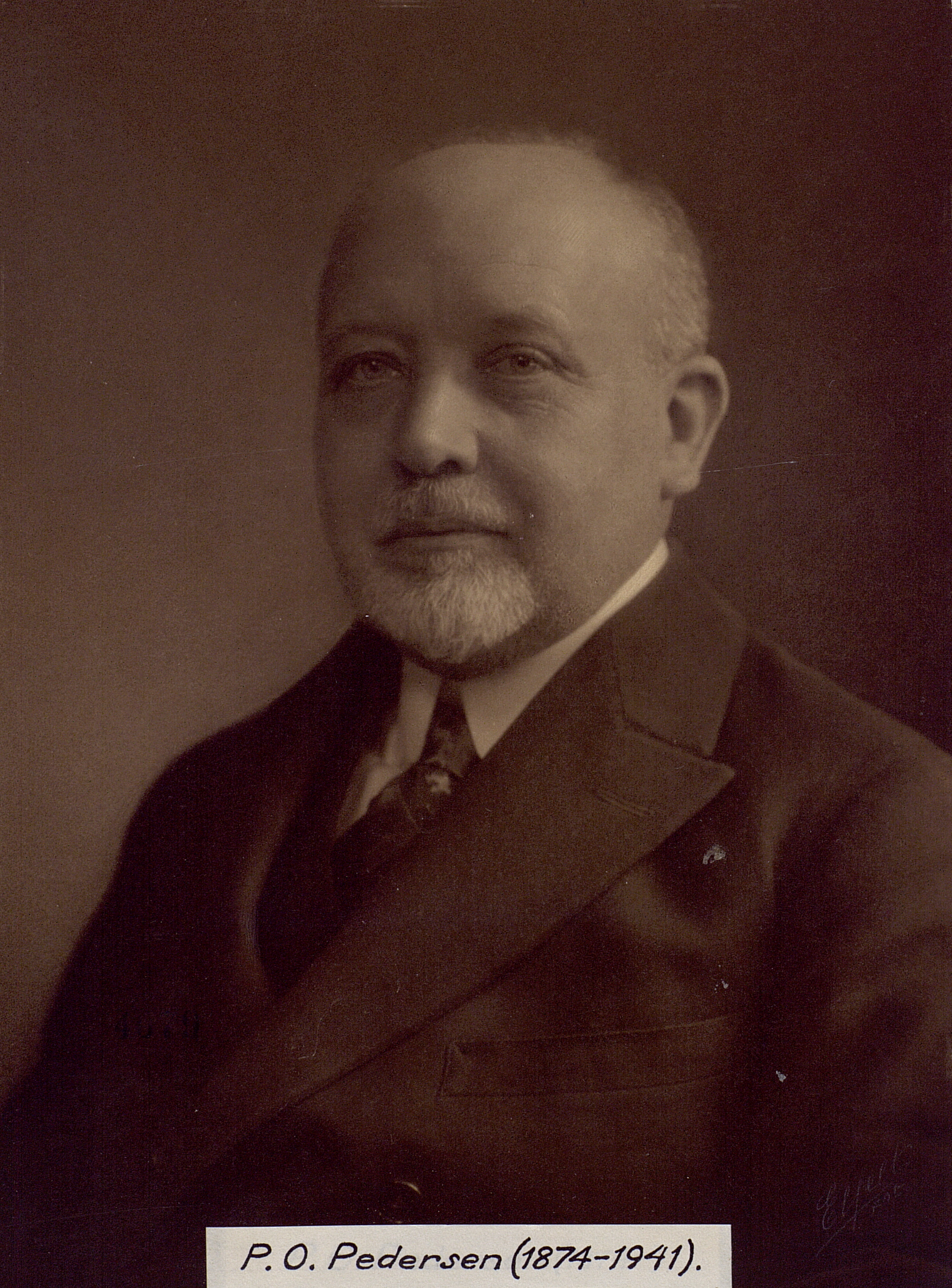
- Born: 19 June 1874; Sig, Varde, Denmark
- Died: 30 August 1941 (aged 67); Copenhagen, Denmark
- Education: College of Advanced Technology
- Known for: Wire recording, the arc converter
- Spouse(s): Maria Theodora Lihme (m. 1899) (1871-1930); Emma Clausen Gad (1902-1997)
- Children: 7
- Awards: Royal Danish Academy of Sciences and Letters Gold Medal (1907); H. C. Ørsted Medal (1928); IRE Medal of Honor (1930)
- Scientific career
- Fields: Physicist
- Workplaces: College of Advanced Technology

Peder Oluf Pedersen (19 June 1874 – 30 August 1941) was a Danish engineer and physicist. He is notable for his work on electrotechnology, his cooperation with Valdemar Poulsen on the developmental work on Wire recorders, which he called a telegraphone, the arc converter known as the Poulsen Arc Transmitter, and his work on electrical currents in the ionosphere.

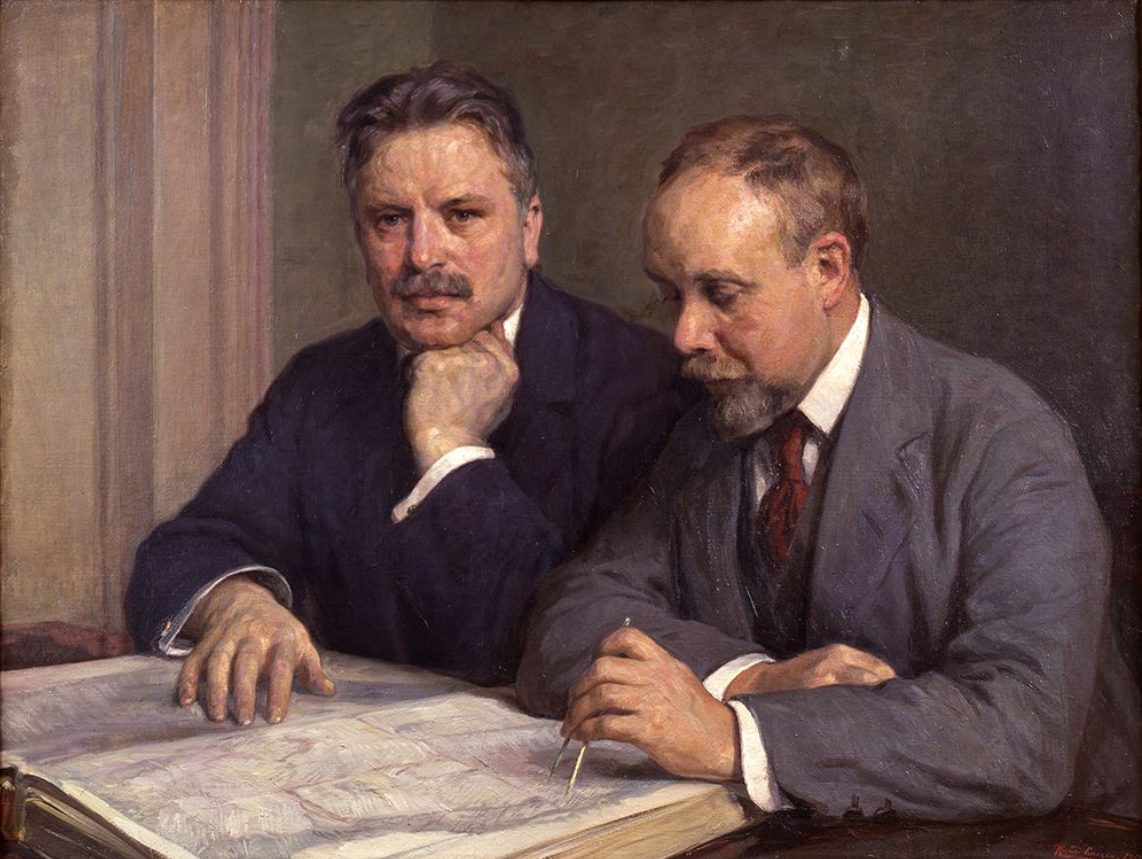
Poulsen and Pedersen painted by Knud Larsen, 1915.

Pedersen became a professor of telegraphy, telephony and radio in 1912. He became principal of the College of Advanced Technology (Den Polytekniske Læreanstalt) in 1922, a title he held until his death. He was a Fellow of the American Institute of Electrical Engineers and was a member of the British Institution of Electrical Engineers. In 1915 he became a Fellow of the Institute of Radio Engineers.

The first expression for the Pedersen current was formulated by Pedersen from in his 1927 work "The Propagation of Radio Waves along the Surface of the Earth and in the Atmosphere", where he pointed out that the geomagnetic field means that the conductivity of the ionosphere is anisotropic.

== Personal life ==
Pedersen was married twice: to Maria Theodora Lihme in 1899 and then to Emma Clausen Gad. He had 4 children with his first wife (Kai Oluf Pedersen (1901-1991) (scientist), Ellen Margrethe Charlotte Pedersen (1903-1979) married to Børge Jessen (both mathematicians), Gunnar Pedersen (1905-1997) Director General of The Postal and Telegraph Directorate, and Inger Margrethe Pedersen (Krøncke after marriage) (1909-1997) (author)), and 3 children with his second wife.

== See also ==
- Tikker
