= Man Hunt (1936 film) =

1936 film by William Clemens

- Theatrical release poster
- Directed by: William Clemens
- Screenplay by: Roy Chanslor
- Story by: Earl Felton
- Produced by: Bryan Foy
- Starring: Ricardo Cortez; Marguerite Churchill; Charles "Chic" Sale; William Gargan; Dick Purcell; Olin Howland
- Cinematography: Joseph Ruttenberg
- Edited by: Louis Hesse
- Music by: Bernhard Kaun
- Distributed by: Warner Bros. Pictures
- Release date: February 15, 1936
- Running time: 60 minutes
- Country: United States
- Language: English

Man Hunt is a 1936 American drama film directed by William Clemens and written by Roy Chanslor. The film stars Ricardo Cortez, Marguerite Churchill, Charles "Chic" Sale, William Gargan, Dick Purcell and Olin Howland. The film was released by Warner Bros. Pictures on February 15, 1936.

== Cast ==
- Ricardo Cortez as Frank Kingman
- Marguerite Churchill as Jane Carpenter
- Charles "Chic" Sale as Ed Hoggins
- William Gargan as Hank Dawson
- Dick Purcell as Skip McHenry
- Olin Howland as Starrett
- Addison Richards as Mel Purdue
- George E. Stone as Silk
- Anita Kerry as Babe
- Nick Copeland as Blackie
- Russell Simpson as Jeff Parkington
- Eddie Shubert as Joe
- Kenneth Harlan as Jim Davis
- Don Barclay as Reporter Waffles
- Cy Kendall as Sheriff at Hackett
- Maude Eburne as Mrs. Hoggins
- Frederic Blanchard as Bill Taylor
- Larry Kent as Jim Bainter
- George Ernest as Jackie
- Milton Kibbee as Sam / Art
- Billy Wayne as Dunk
