= William Duddell =

British physicist

Duddell's devices

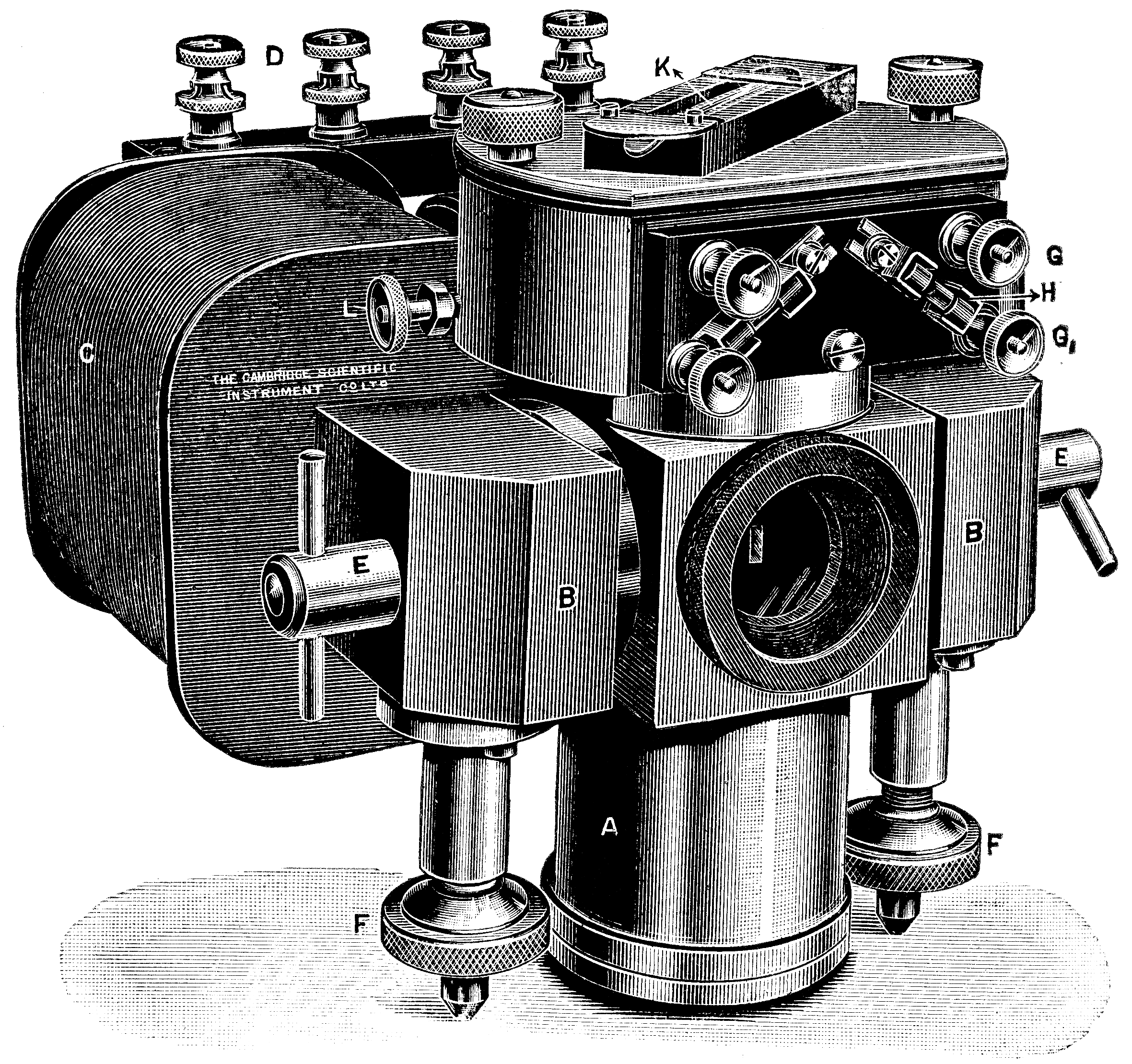

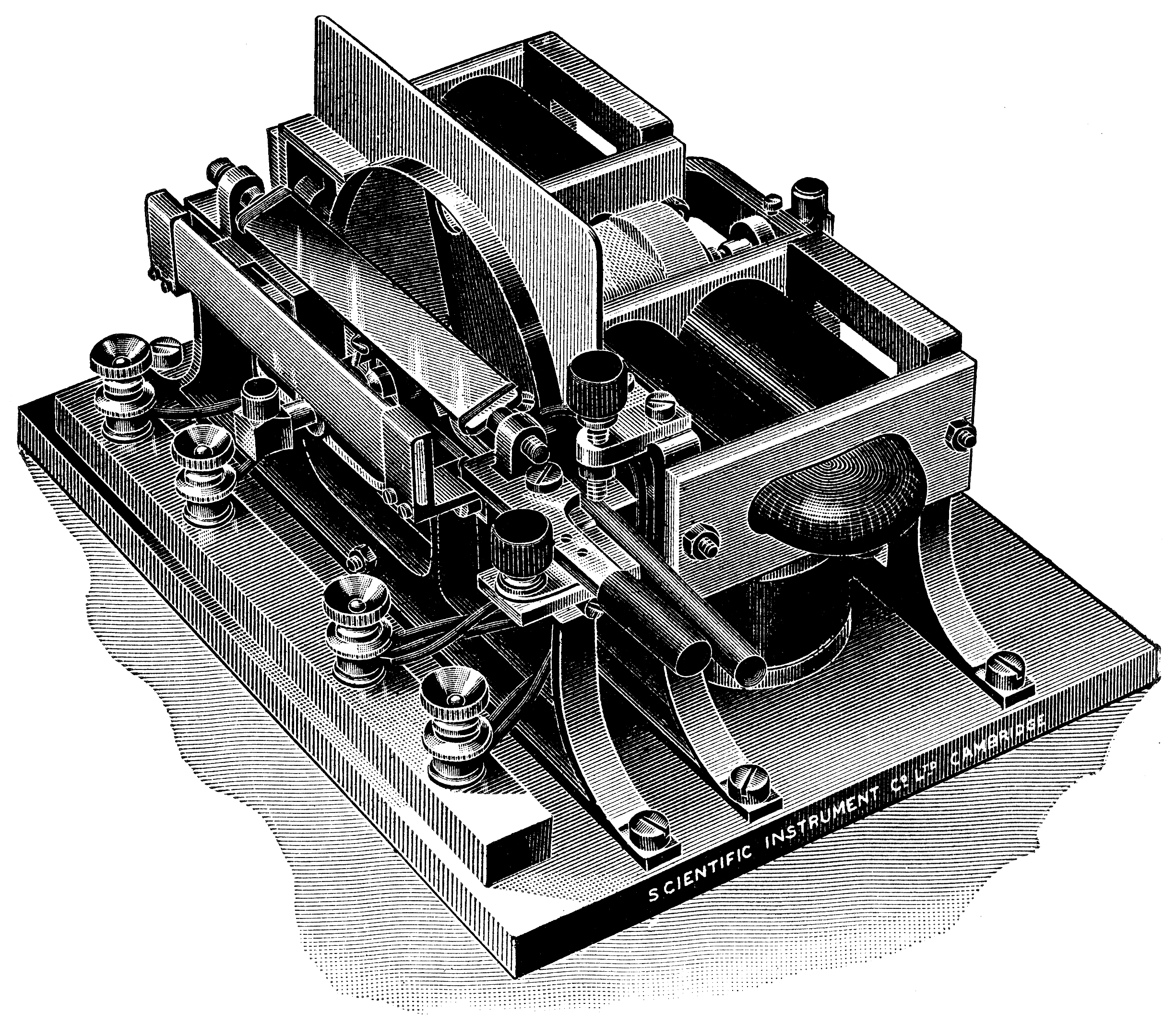

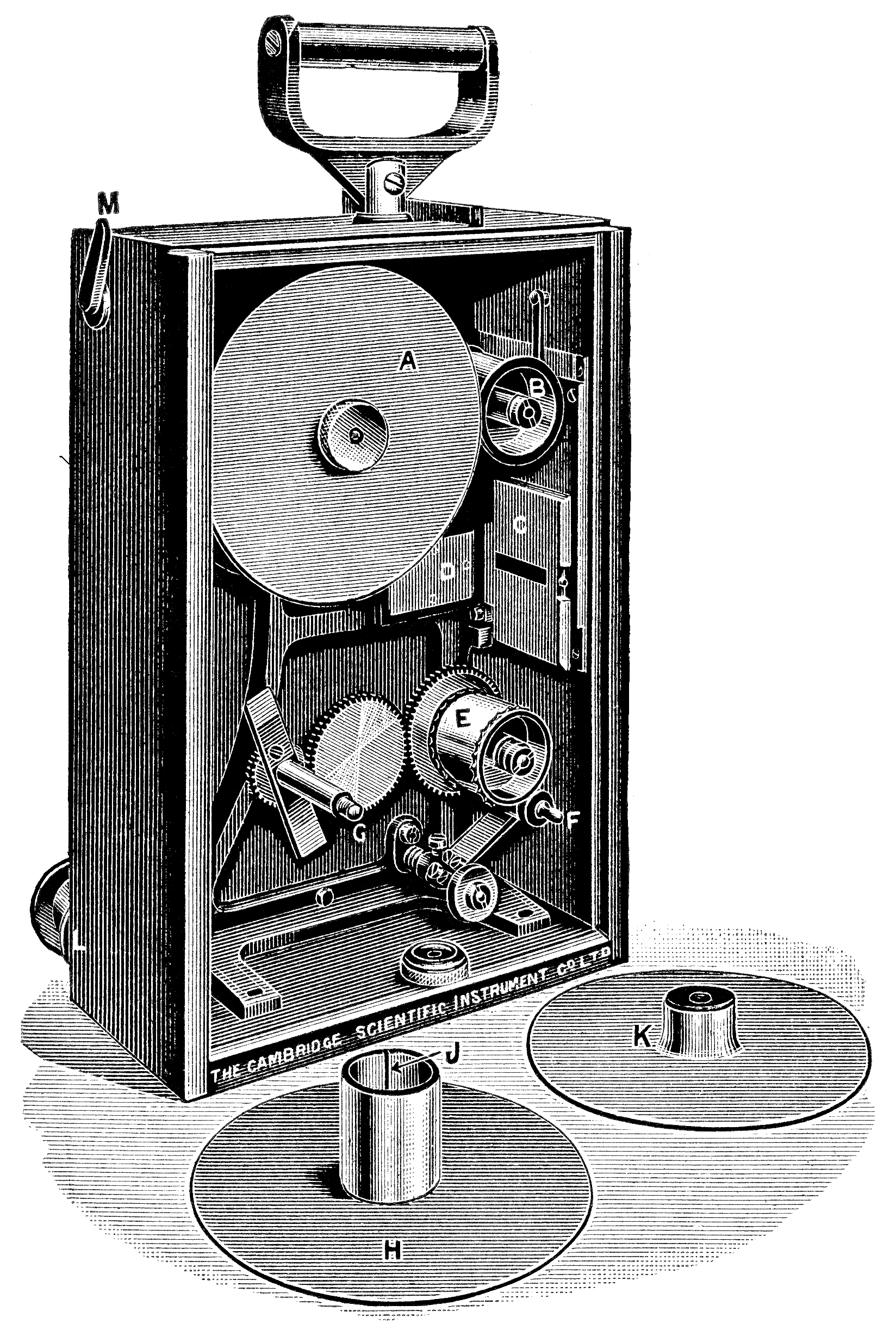

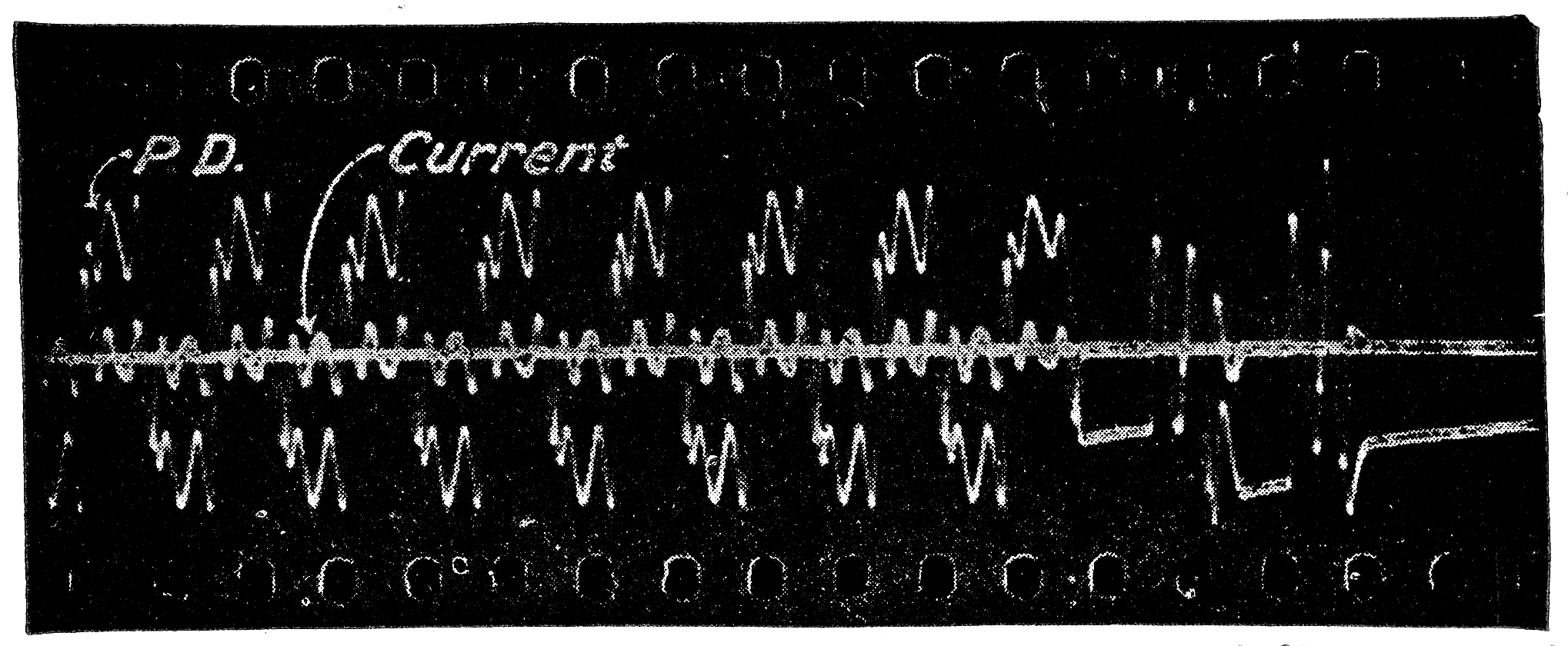
Top-left: Duddell moving-coil oscillograph with mirror in oil bath. Top-middle: Rotating shutter and moving mirror assembly used with Duddell oscillograph, for placing time-index marks next to the waveform pattern. Top-right: Moving-film camera for recording the waveform. Bottom: Film recording of sparking across switch contacts, as a high-voltage circuit is disconnected.

William Du Bois Duddell (1 July 1872, in Kensington, London – 4 November 1917, in Wandsworth, London) was an English physicist and electrical engineer. His inventions include the moving coil oscillograph, as well as the thermo-ammeter and thermo-galvanometer.

== Life and career ==
Duddell was born William Du Bois to Frances Kate Du Bois, who married George Duddell in 1881. At the age of four he constructed an automaton by combining a toy mouse with clockwork. His younger sister Gladys Duddell was a tennis player.

Duddell was privately educated in England and France and rose quickly through the prestigious City & Guilds Schools via scholarships.

He died at the age of 45.

== Duddell's "singing arc" ==
Prior to the invention of the incandescent light bulb, arc lamps were used to light the streets. They created light using an electrical arc between two carbon electrodes. These lamps often produced audible humming, hissing, or even howling sounds. In 1899 Duddell, a student of William Ayrton at London Central Technical College, was asked by Ayrton to look into this problem. The sounds were created by instabilities in the current caused by the arc's negative resistance. Duddell connected a tuned circuit consisting of an inductor and capacitor across an arc. The negative resistance of the arc excited audio frequency oscillations in the tuned circuit at its resonant frequency, which could be heard as a musical tone coming from the arc. Duddell used his oscillograph to determine the precise conditions required to produce oscillations. To demonstrate his invention before the London Institution of Electrical Engineers, he wired a keyboard to produce different tones from the arc, and used it to play a tune, God Save the Queen making it one of the first examples of electronic music. This device, which became known as the "singing arc", was one of the first electronic oscillators and Plasma speakers. Although he was not the first to discover, as Hermann Theodor Simon published the phenomenon in 1898.

Duddell's circuit was limited to audio frequencies. However, Danish physicists Valdemar Poulsen and P. O. Pederson were able to increase the frequency of Duddell's oscillator to the radio range, and in 1902 patented the Poulsen arc radio transmitter, the first transmitter which could generate continuous waves. Poulsen arc wireless transmitters were used worldwide until the 1920s.

== Honours ==
Duddell was made a Fellow of the Royal Society in 1907. The British Institute of Physics named its Duddell Medal and Prize in his honour. In 1907–08 he served as president of the British Institute of Radiology. In 1912 he became the youngest president of the Institution of Electrical Engineers and served two terms.

In 1906 and 1911, he was invited to deliver the Royal Institution Christmas Lecture on Signalling to a Distance and Modern Electricity respectively.
