= Edward G. Boyle =

American set decorator (1899–1977)

- Born: Edward Joshua Boyle; January 30, 1899; Cobden, Ontario, Canada
- Died: February 17, 1977 (aged 78); Hollywood, California, U.S.
- Occupation: Set decorator
- Years active: 1925–1970
- Spouse(s): Mary Eunice McCarthy; 1922 until at least 1931

Edward George Boyle (born Edward Joshua Boyle; January 30, 1899 – February 17, 1977) was a Canadian set decorator active in Hollywood between 1925 and 1970.

== Career ==
Boyle's career began in the early 1930s, when he started working on the first of over 100 films. His filmography includes such credits as an uncredited assist on the wartorn old South in Victor Fleming's classic Gone with the Wind (1939), the Nazi-influenced designs for Charlie Chaplin's fictional country of Tomania in The Great Dictator (1940), the gritty boxing world in Robert Rossen's Body and Soul (1947) and Mark Robson's Champion (1949), an elegant Bournemouth seaside hotel in Separate Tables (1958), island life at the turn of the century in George Roy Hill's Hawaii (1966) and the sophisticated demi-monde of the multi-millionaire lifestyles in Norman Jewison's The Thomas Crown Affair (1968).

Winner of the Academy Award in 1960 for Billy Wilder's The Apartment, Boyle was nominated six other times: for The Son of Monte Cristo in 1940, Some Like It Hot in 1959, The Children's Hour in 1961, Seven Days in May in 1964, The Fortune Cookie in 1966 and Gaily Gaily in 1969.
