= Haraden Pratt =

American electrical engineer and radio pioneer (1891–1969)

- Born: July 18, 1891; San Francisco, California
- Died: August 1, 1969 (aged 78)
- Awards: IEEE Medal of Honor (1944); IEEE Founders Medal (1960)
- Scientific career
- Fields: Electrical engineering

Haraden Pratt (July 18, 1891 – August 1, 1969) was an American electrical engineer and radio pioneer.

== Biography ==
Pratt was born in San Francisco, California, where his parents were telegraph operators. He learned Morse code when young and worked briefly as a shipboard wireless operator before entering the University of California (Class of 1914). After graduation, he joined the American Marconi Company and helped to install and operate its 300-kilowatt trans-Pacific radio station at Bolinas, California, and its companion receiver station in Marshall, California.

From 1915 to 1920 Pratt was a radio aide to the United States Navy, leading its radio laboratory and engineering at Mare Island Navy Yard, California. In this role he installed radio equipment on Navy ships and maintained West Coast shore stations until 1918, when he moved to Washington, D.C., to take charge of the construction and maintenance of all high-power Navy radio stations.

From 1920 to 1926 Pratt worked for the Federal Telegraph Company in Palo Alto, California, where he designed a system for commercial radio telegraph service. When in 1926 the United States Congress passed the Air Commerce Act to fund radio aids to air navigation, J. Howard Dellinger of the National Bureau of Standards tapped Pratt and Harry Diamond to create a suitable radio beacon system in 1927–1928.

In 1928 Pratt became chief engineer of the Mackay Radio and Telegraph Company, subsequently acquired by the International Telephone and Telegraph Company (ITT), where he eventually became vice president and general manager. During World War II, Pratt served as Division Chief in the Office of Scientific Research and Development and was Chairman of the Radio Technical Planning Board 1945–1949, and in 1946 was an official observer of the Bikini atomic bomb tests. He remained with ITT until 1951 when he served from 1951 to 1953 as telecommunications advisor to Presidents Truman and Eisenhower. Pratt was vice president of the American Cable and Radio Corporation from 1953 to 1958.

Pratt joined the Institute of Radio Engineers (IRE), became an IRE Director in 1935, served as president of the IRE in 1938, and was its secretary from 1943 to 1965. He was awarded the IRE Medal of Honor in 1944 "in recognition of his engineering contributions to the development of radio, of his work in the extension of communication facilities to distant lands, and of his constructive leadership in Institute affairs," and the Founder's Award in 1960. The IEEE Haraden Pratt Award was established in 1971 in his honor. His papers are archived at the Bancroft Library, University of California, Berkeley.
