= Federal Telegraph Company =

American radio communications company

The Federal Telegraph Company was a United States manufacturing and communications company that played a pivotal role in the 20th century in the development of radio communications. Initially focused on transmitting voice wirelessly, the focus of the company shifted to competing with existing telegraph operators such as Western Union. The company would later mature into a Government contractor working closely with the United States Navy.

== History ==
Stock certificate of Poulsen Wireless Company

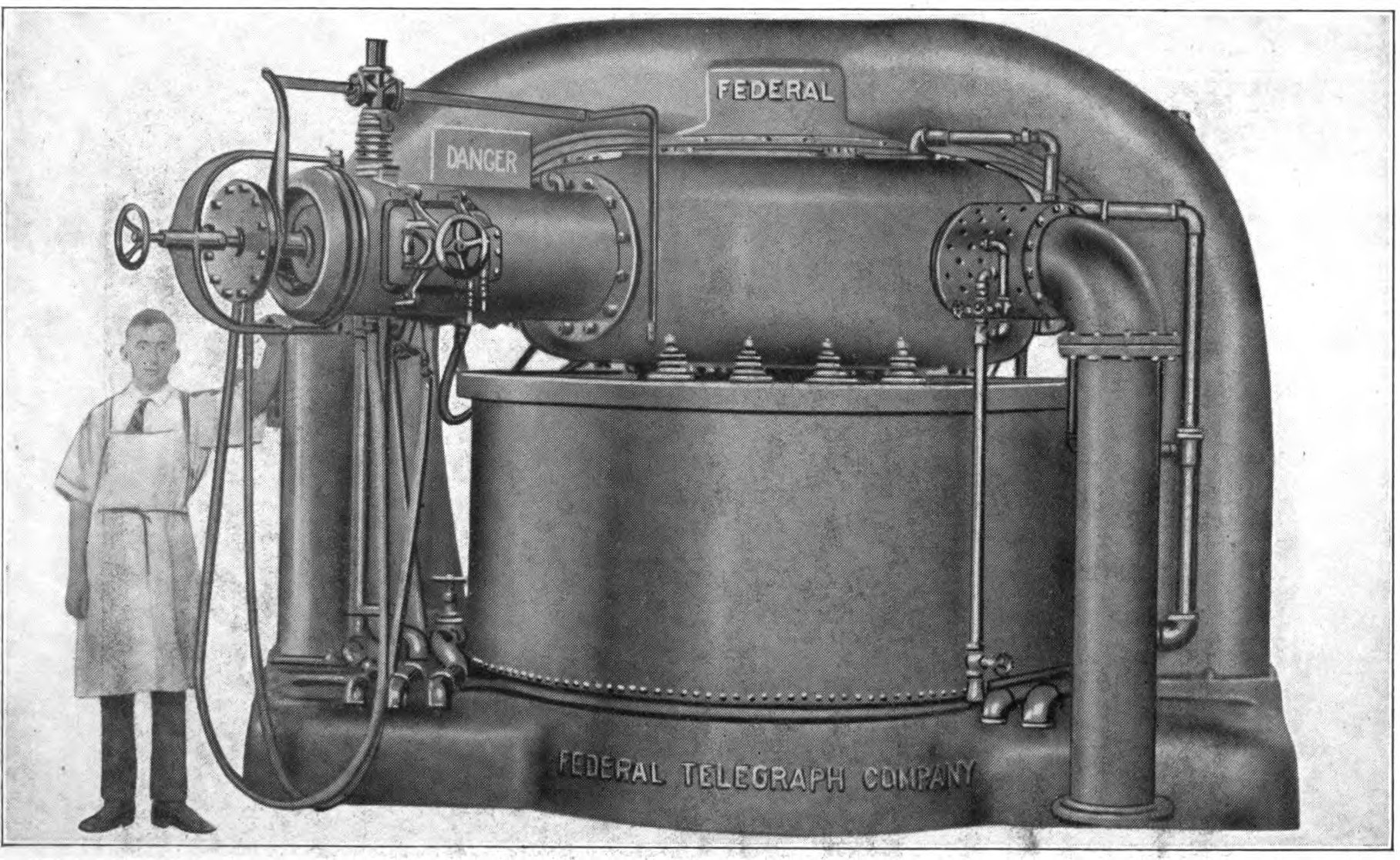
Federal Telegraph built 1MW arc transmitter

The company was founded in Palo Alto, California in 1909 by Cyril Frank Elwell, and was first known as the Poulsen Wireless Company, after licensing Valdemar Poulsen's arc transmitter for use in the United States. The company initially developed high-powered transmitters used for long distance radiotelegraph communication. In 1911–13, Lee De Forest and two assistants worked at Federal Telegraph on the first vacuum tube amplifier and oscillator, which De Forest called the "Oscillaton" after his earlier Audion.

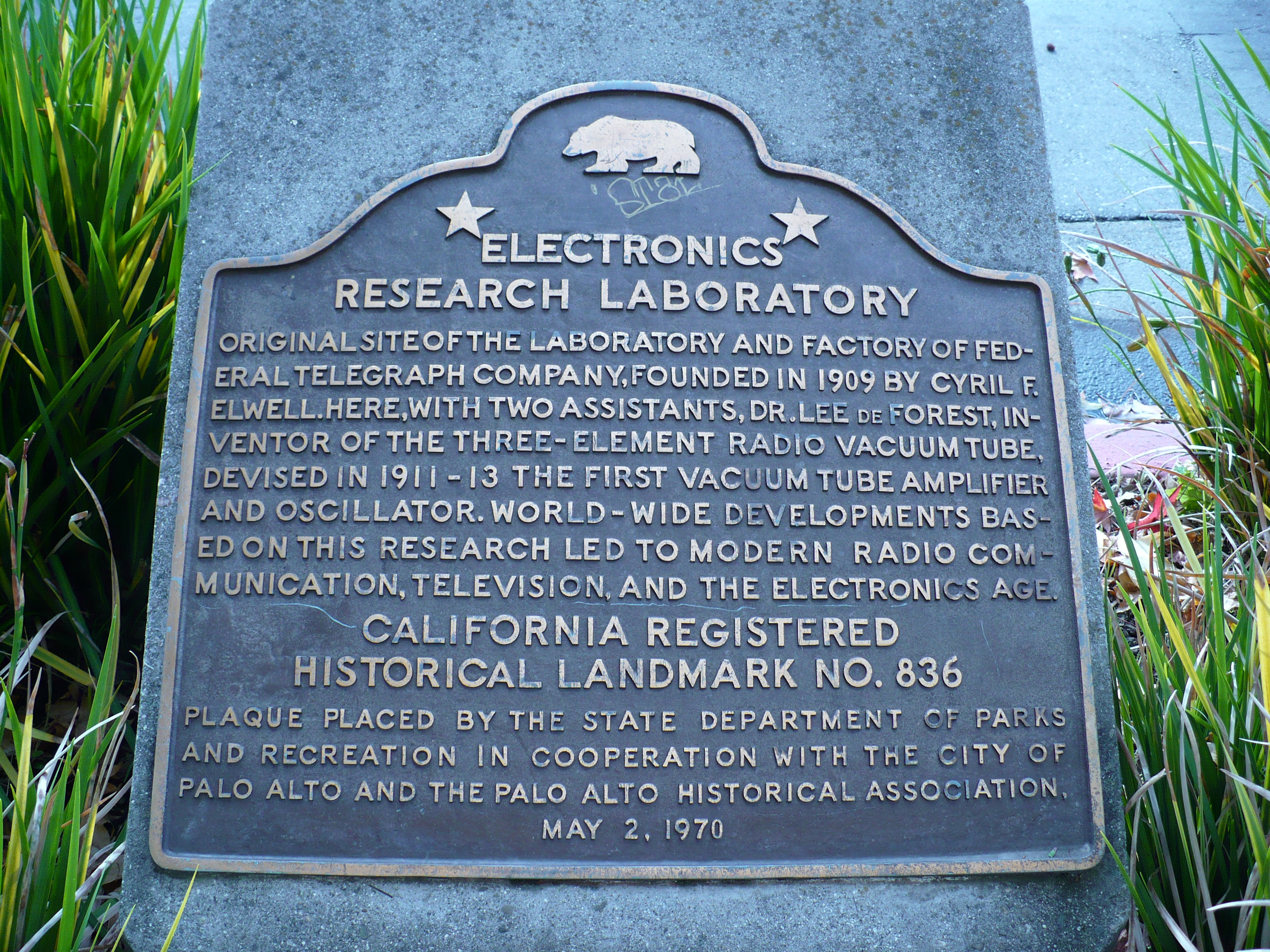
California Historical Landmark No. 836 at the corner of Channing and Emerson in Palo Alto, California at the original location of FTC laboratory

In 1912 the US Congress appropriated $1 million to build a chain of radio stations for the United States Navy. Elwell held discussions with naval officials and it was decided that a demonstration would be carried out at the new naval station in Arlington, Virginia. This demonstration involved using Federal equipment to exchange messages from Arlington to the US battleship USS Arkansas as it traveled on its shakedown cruise to the Canal zone. Further testing included transmissions from Arlington to Federal's station in Honolulu which was a then record breaking transmission of over 4,500 miles. As a result of this and other testing Federal won a contract to provide a 100kW arc for a radio station in the Canal Zone, within a year they had also won contracts for naval stations in Massachusetts, Texas and Cuba.

After the U.S. entry into World War I in April 1917, the government took control of the radio industry. The United States Navy then purchased nearly all of the U.S. commercial radio stations, including, effective May 15, 1918, Federal Telegraph's for $1.6 million. (Company president Washington Dodge, accused of arranging to personally benefit from the transaction, committed suicide in June 1919.) Federal Telegraph continued to provide overland service using leased telephone lines. After the conclusion of the war, legislation proposed by the Navy, known as the "Alexander bill", was introduced to continue government radio station ownership. However, this received little support, and it was announced that instead the stations would be returned to their original owners, with Federal Telegraph resuming station operations in 1921.

In 1924 a controlling interest in the company was acquired by Rudolph Spreckels who then hired Ellery W. Stone to be president of the company. Stone realised that Federal had Shop rights to the patents that Lee de Forest had developed while working for Federal. This meant that Federal could make and use vacuum tubes that were covered by de Forest's five patents and not face a patent infringement case.

The company was acquired in August 1927 by the Mackay Companies, and was renamed the Mackay Radio and Telegraph Company (California). Originally a separate entity within the Mackay Companies, when International Telephone and Telegraph (ITT) purchased the Mackay Companies in 1928, Federal remained a component of the Mackay structure as a manufacturing entity.

In 1931, Dr. Ernest O. Lawrence, inventor of the cyclotron, convinced Federal Telegraph to donate an 80-ton magnet they had developed for a canceled project in China to his first cyclotron project on the campus of the University of California Berkeley. Lawrence's invention of the cyclotron was the basis of his being awarded the Nobel Prize in 1939.

In 1940, Sosthenes Behn moved Federal Telegraph under ITT directly so that its manufacturing capabilities could help ITT replace those in Europe that had been shut down because of the war and the Fall of France.

In 1954, FTR changed its name from Federal Telegraph and Radio Corporation - an IT&T associate to Federal Telegraph and Radio Company - division of IT&T, and its research division became the Federal Telecommunications Laboratories, both continuing as subsidiaries of ITT after World War II through at least the 1950s.
