= Valdemar Poulsen =

Danish engineer (1889–1942)

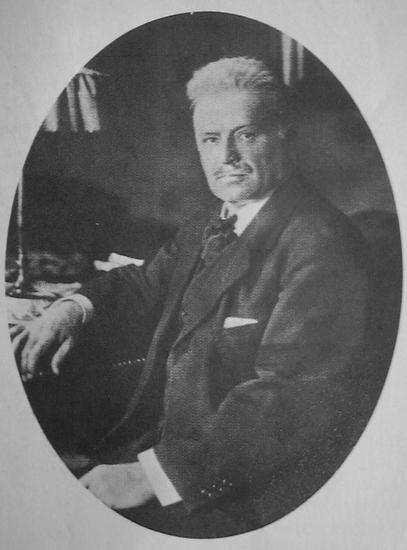
- Poulsen, c. 1898
- Born: 23 November 1869; Copenhagen, Denmark
- Died: 23 July 1942 (aged 72); Gentofte, Denmark
- Awards: Valdemar Poulsen Gold Medal (1939)
- Engineering career
- Projects: Tikker; magnetic recorder; Poulsen arc

Valdemar Poulsen (23 November 1869 – 23 July 1942) was a Danish engineer and inventor who developed a magnetic wire recorder called the telegraphone in 1898. He also made significant contributions to early radio technology, including the first continuous wave radio transmitter, the Poulsen arc, which was used for a majority of the earliest audio radio transmissions, before being supplanted by the development of vacuum-tube transmitters.

== Early life ==
Poulsen was born on 23 November 1869 in Copenhagen. He was the son of the Supreme Court judge Jonas Nicolai Johannes Poulsen and Rebekka Magdalene (née Brandt). He studied natural sciences at the University of Copenhagen from 1889 until 1893, but left before graduating to begin working as an assistant engineer at the technical department of the Copenhagen Telephone Company. Poulsen then left this position in order to work as an independent inventor.

== Recording innovations ==
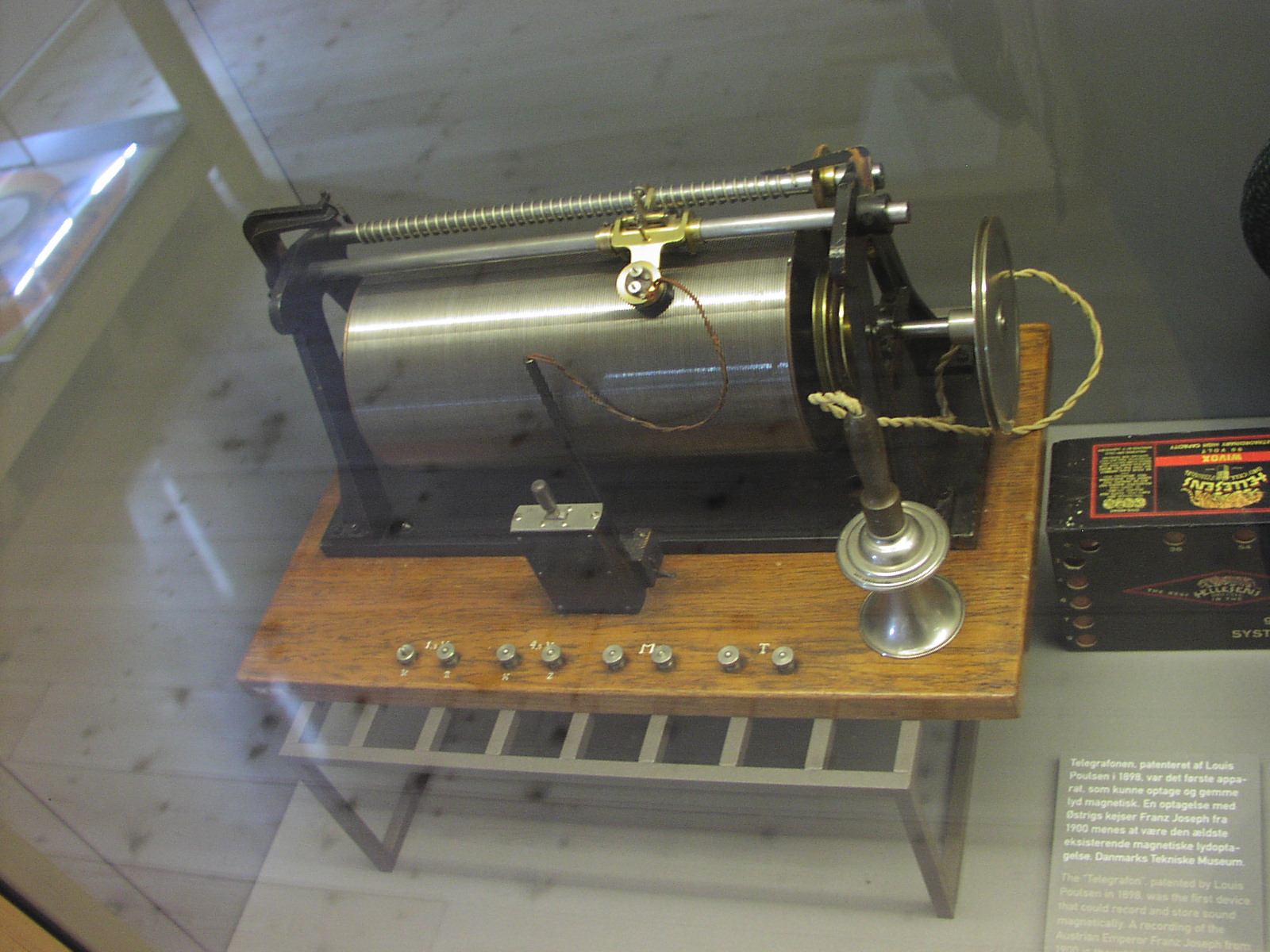
Poulsen's magnetic wire recorder

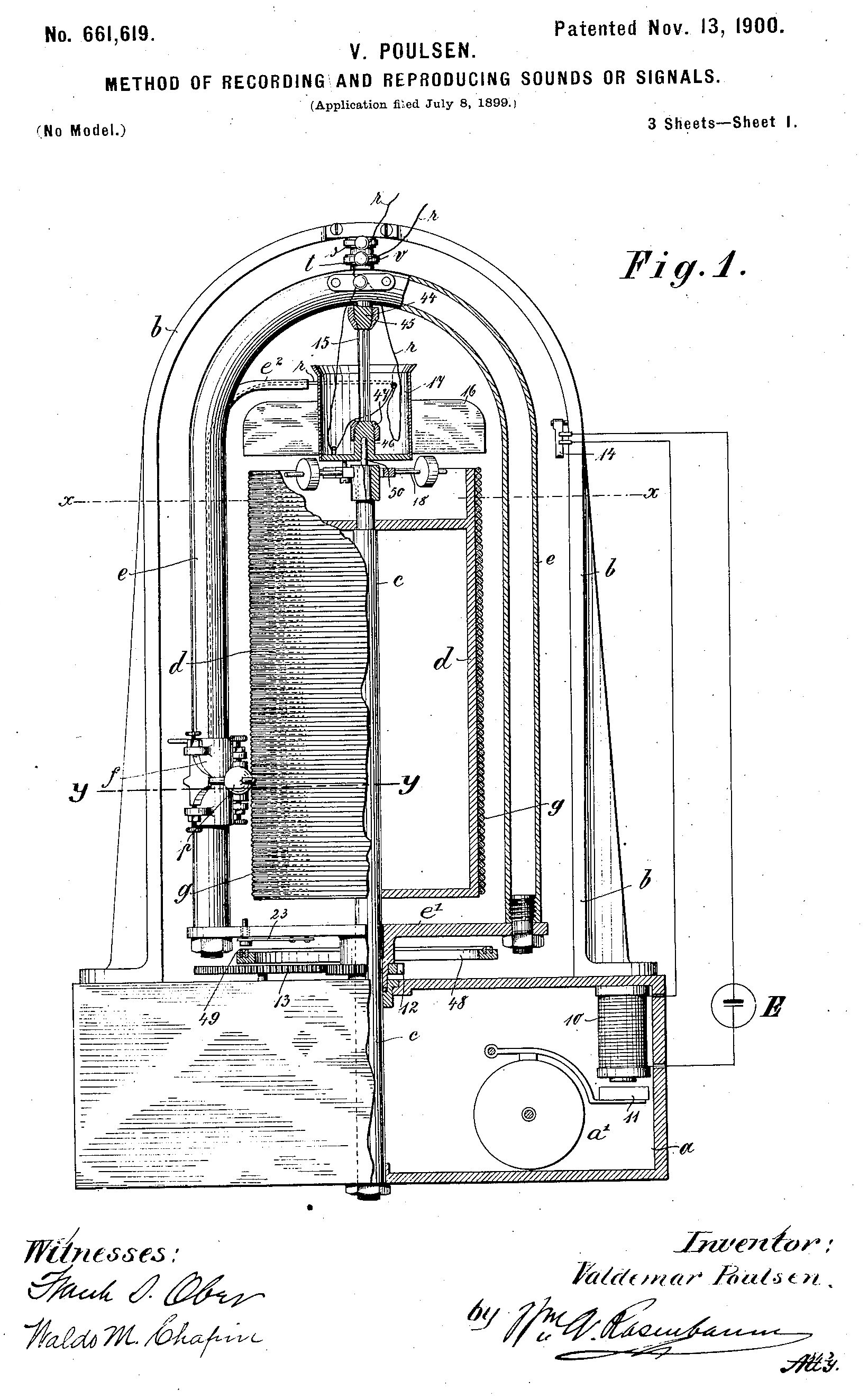
Poulsen's 1900 US patent for a magnetic wire recorder

Poulsen's recording of the voice of Emperor Franz Josef of Austria

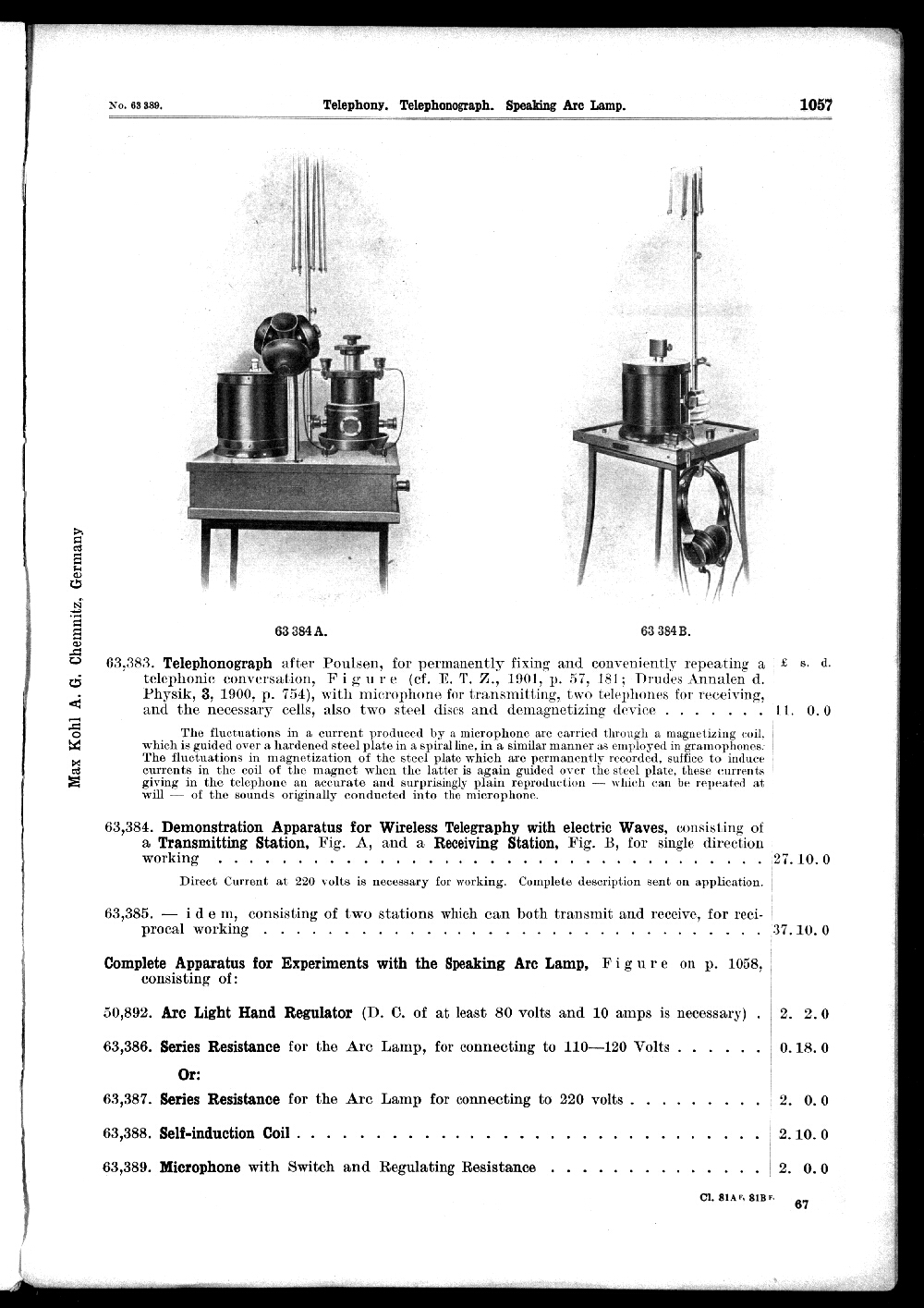
"Telephonograph after Poulsen, for permanently fixing and conveniently repeating a telephonic conversation." From a 1911 catalog of physical apparatuses.

Magnetic recording was demonstrated in principle as early as 1898 by Poulsen in his telegraphone (or telephonograph). Magnetic wire recording, and its successor, magnetic tape recording, employ a magnetizable medium which moves past a recording head. A variable electrical signal, analogous to the sound that is to be recorded, is fed to the recording head, inducing a magnetization pattern that encoded the signal. A playback head, which may be the same as the recording head, can then pick up the changes in the magnetic field from the wire and convert them into an electrical current, that is reproduced as audio when connected to a telephone receiver.

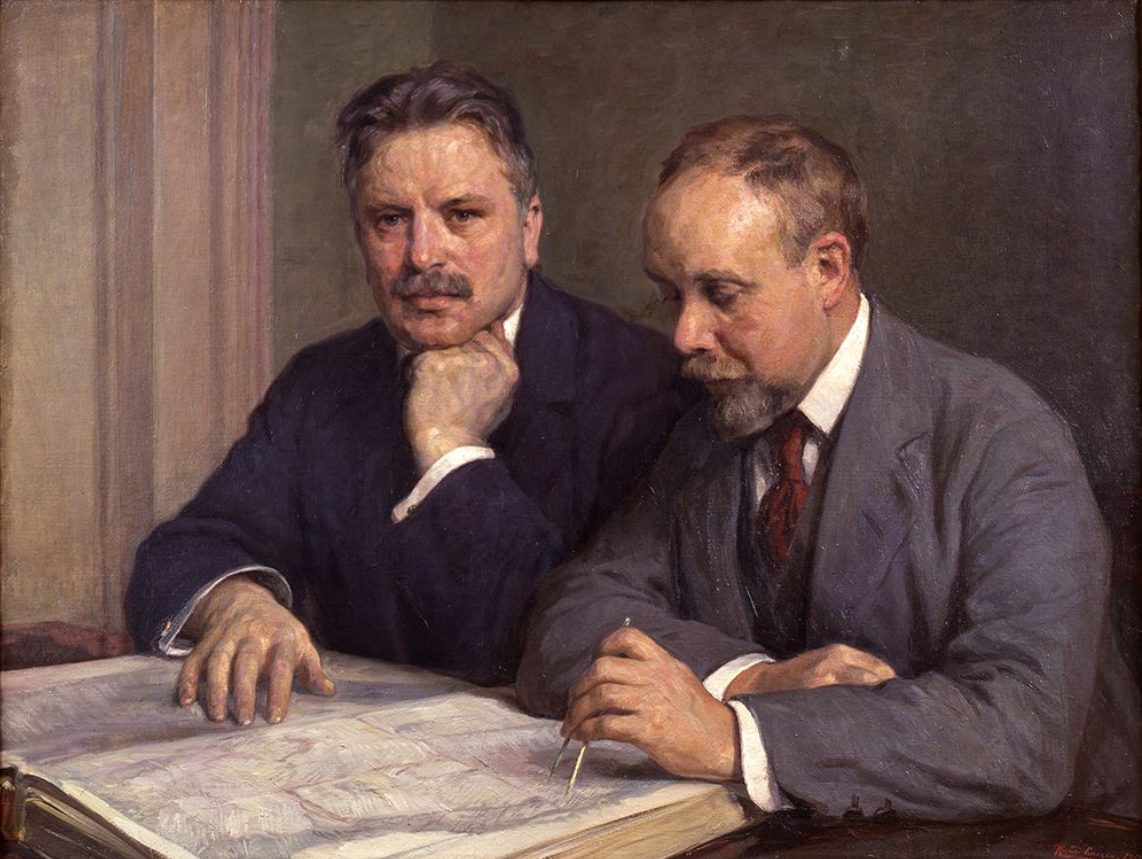
Poulsen and Pedersen painted by Knud Larsen, 1915.

Poulsen obtained a Telegraphone patent in 1898, and with his assistant, Peder Oluf Pedersen, later developed other magnetic recorders that recorded on steel wire, tape, or disks. None of these devices had electronic amplification, but the recorded signal was strong enough to be heard through a headset or transmitted on telephone wires.

At the 1900 Exposition Universelle in Paris, Poulsen demonstrated the invention, and recorded the voice of Emperor Franz Josef of Austria which is believed to be the oldest surviving magnetic audio recording.

It was anticipated that the Telegraphone would have numerous applications for dictation and recording telephone messages, and could also be used for making repeated announcements by telephone newspapers. One enthusiastic reviewer, noting the 30 minute recording time and other features, predicted that "this instrument will mean almost as much to the business man and to the world at large as does the telephone itself". However, its complexity and the lack of a means to amplify its recordings greatly limited its adoption, and the invention was financially unsuccessful.

== Radio development ==
Poulsen developed an arc converter transmitter in 1903, referred to as the "Poulsen Arc Transmitter", which was widely used for audio radio transmissions before the advent of vacuum tube technology. This invention made modifications to William Duddell's "singing arc" in order to operate at much higher frequencies, which made it a generator of continuous radio waves, which, unlike earlier spark-gap transmitters, could be used for amplitude modulation (AM) audio transmissions. The most important modification was the introduction of an atmosphere containing hydrogen in a strong transverse magnetic field.

In 1907 the system was able to communicate between Lyngby and Newcastle with a 100-foot (30m) mast. In 1908 Poulsen telephoned 145 miles (230 km) without wires from Ejerg to Lyngby in Denmark, using only 3 kilowatts, and in 1910 telephoned 295 miles (475 km) from Los Angeles to San Francisco in the United States, using 12 kilowatts. Music played in the Poulsen station in Berlin was received 215 miles (345 km) away at Copenhagen.

The Federal Telegraph Company, specializing in arc transmitters, licensed Poulsen's arc for use in the United States, although the company primarily employed high-powered arc transmitters for long distance radiotelegraph communication.

Use of arc transmitters largely ceased in the early 1920s, supplanted by Alexanderson alternators used for long distance telegraphy, and vacuum-tube transmitters. In 1909, Einar Dessau used a shortwave transmitter to establish contact with Paulsen. Beginning in 1907 Lee de Forest employed arc transmitters for early radio broadcasting experimentation, but eventually switched to vacuum-tube transmitters. Recounting the superiority of vacuum-tube transmitters, in his 1950 autobiography de Forest wrote that he had been "totally unaware of the fact that in the little audion tube, which I was then using only as a radio detector, lay dormant the principle of oscillation which, had I but realized it, would have caused me to unceremoniously dump into the ash can all of the fine arc mechanisms which I had ever constructed, a procedure which a few years later actually took place all over the world!"

== Personal life ==
Poulsen married in 1894 to Frederikke Marie Rasmussen. She died in 1921. In 1923, he married Asta Stoltz Nielsen. In his first marriage, he was the father of the geologist Christian Henrik Otto Poulsen. Poulsen died on 6 August 1942 in Gentofte. He is buried in the local Gentofte Cemetery.

== Honors ==
In 1907 he was awarded the Gold Medal of the Royal Danish Society for Science, and in 1909 an honorary Doctor of Philosophy degree from the University of Leipzig. He also received the Medal of Merit from the Danish government. At his death he was a fellow of the Danish Academy of Sciences, the Danish Academy of Technical Science and the Swedish Institute for Engineering Research.

== Legacy ==
The Valdemar Poulsen Gold Medal was awarded each year for outstanding research in the field of radio techniques and related fields by the Danish Academy of Technical Sciences. The award was presented on 23 November, the anniversary of his birth, and Poulsen himself received the inaugural award in 1939. The award was discontinued in 1993.

Poulsen is one of the men seen on Peder Severin Krøyer's monumental 1904 oil-on-canvas group portrait painting Men of Industry (Frederiksborg Castle). A commemorative plaque on the facade of Landemærket 3 in Copenhagen commemorates that Poulsen was born in the building. The plaque was installed in 1043. A Danish stamp was issued marking the centennial of Poulsen's birth in 1969.

On 23 November 2018 he was honoured with a Google Doodle for his 149th birthday.
