= Heroes in Blue (1939 film) =

1939 film by William Watson

- Directed by: William Watson
- Written by: Charles Williams; Charles W. Curran
- Produced by: T.R. Williams
- Starring: Dick Purcell; Bernadene Hayes; Frank Sheridan
- Cinematography: Harry Neumann
- Edited by: Bruce Schoengarth
- Distributed by: Monogram Pictures
- Release date: 7 November 1939
- Running time: 61 minutes
- Country: United States
- Language: English

Heroes in Blue is a 1939 American crime film produced by T.R. Williams for Monogram Pictures, directed by William Watson and starring Dick Purcell, Bernadene Hayes and Frank Sheridan. The screenplay was written by Charles Williams from an original story by Charles Williams and Charles Curran. The film was released on November 7, 1939.

Moran, a gangster, hires Joe Murphy to make a large wager on a horse race, but he doesn't make the bet in time. The horse wins, but Moran's men believe Joe is about to run off with the payoff, and one of them is killed in an argument with Joe. Joe's father Mike, who is a night watchman, tries to make a deal with Moran but it backfires. Joe's policeman brother, Terry, has to go after his brother who is now wanted for murder, while also making sure Moran ends up behind bars.

== Plot ==
Former cop Mike Murphy (Frank Sheridan) works as a night watchman, having left the police force for a safer line of work. One of his sons, Terry Murphy (Dick Purcell) is a police officer trying to get a promotion so he can marry Kathleen (Julie Warren). The other son, Joe Murphy (Charles Quigley), works for a shady businessman named Moran (Edward Keane) who owns a trucking business.

Moran sends Joe to the racetrack with $2000 to make a bet on a horse called Running Wild for a $10,000 payoff, and he also sends Blackie to keep an eye on Joe and make sure he comes back with the money, a cab driver named Moe, who also works for Moran, drives them there. After Joe overhears other men talking badly about Running Wild he calls Moran's office to confirm the name of the horse and is not able to make the bet in time. Joe uses the money to bet on a different horse but loses. After the race is over Joe knows he's gonna be in bad trouble if he doesn't give Moran the payoff, so he tries to call Daisy just before attempting to slip away. Blackie accuses him of trying to run off with the money, Joe tries to explain but Blackie's gun goes off and he is killed by his own gun.

Joe and his wife Daisy (Bernadene Hayes) go into hiding at a hotel, and then Daisy asks Kathleen for her help which she agrees to. Terry is asked by the police captain to bring Joe in for questioning and he knows he has no choice. But first he has to find his brother. Stunned by the recent bad news, Mrs. Murphy (Lillian Elliott), Terry and Joe's mother, has a heart attack and is hospitalized. Mike tries clear Joe's debt with Moran, and he ends up agreeing to look the other way while Moran's men burglarize a warehouse on Mike's beat while he is on his night watchman shift. Mike then goes to Joe's hotel to tell him he took care of his debt and urges him to visit his mother in the hospital, which he does while Kathleen happens to be there. Terry shows up and the two men argue, and Joe takes off. Terry discovers that Kathleen is somehow involved in helping Joe, and she tells Terry where Joe is hiding out which leads to his arrest.

Joe is convicted of murdering Blackie, and Daisy turns to Terry for help in clearing Joe's name. Moe, the cab driver, is the only witness that can attest to Joe's innocence, and Daisy promises Terry she will find out some information. Moran threatens to tell Terry that Mike looked the other way during a burglary unless Mike lets Moran's men burglarize again, this time a jewelry store. This time Terry is nearby and tries to prevent the heist but is shot by one of Moran's men.

The day Terry returns back to work, Daisy tips him off about a burglary at a warehouse on Mike's beat that will be happening that night and Terry makes sure he is there. Terry and Mike discover an unlocked warehouse and enter through different doors. Mike tries to get Moran and his men to leave the warehouse, and Terry overhears Moran telling Mike that it was him that let them in. Terry attempts to arrest the men but there is a shootout and Mike is shot by one of Moran's men and is able to shoot Moran just before he dies in order to save Terry's life. Before dying, Moran tells Terry where the cab driver is hiding out and that he has information that will clear Joe. With the information from Moran the police are able to locate the cab driver and Joe is exonerated.

== Cast ==
- Dick Purcell as Terry Murphy
- Charles Quigley as Joe Murphy
- Bernadene Hayes as Daisy
- Edward Keane as Moran
- Julie Warren as Kathleen
- Lillian Elliott as Mrs. Murphy
- Frank Sheridan as Mike Murphy
- Paul Fix as Henchman
