= Ellery W. Stone =

US Navy Rear admiral and President of ITT Inc.

Ellery Wheeler Stone
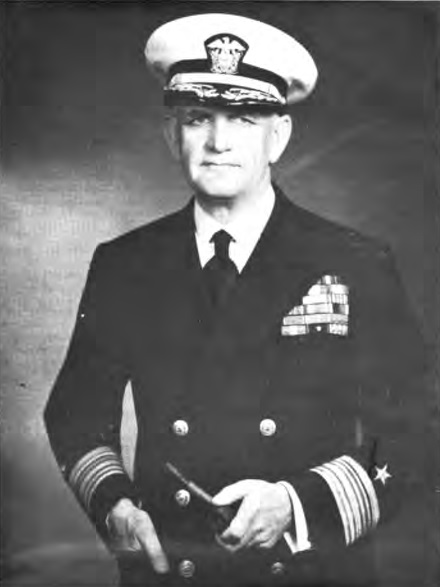
- RADM Ellery W. Stone, USNR
- Born: January 14, 1894; Oakland, California, US
- Died: September 18, 1981 (aged 87); Montclair, New Jersey, US
- Burial place: Arlington National Cemetery
- Military career
- Allegiance: United States
- Branch: United States Navy
- Service years: 1917–1919, 1941–1947
- Rank: Rear admiral
- Conflicts: World War I World War II
- Awards: Navy Distinguished Service Medal; Army Distinguished Service Medal; Legion of Honour; Order of the British Empire
- Other work: Vice President of ITT Inc.

Ellery Wheeler Stone CBE (January 14, 1894 – September 18, 1981) was a prominent figure in the history of radio, serving both in government and corporations during the first half of the twentieth century and decorated Rear admiral in the United States Naval Reserve during World War II, while served as Chief Commissioner, Allied Control Commission in Italy.

Following the War, Stone served as the head of the Commercial Cable Company, a subsidiary of the International Telephone and Telegraph corporation, and later oversaw its American Cable and Radio Corporation division until 1958. He later served as Vice President of International Telephone and Telegraph and retired in 1969.

== Early career ==
Ellery W. Stone was born on January 14, 1894, in Oakland, California, as the son of Edgar P. Stone and Florence P. Weeks. He became interested in electrical apparatus in 1908, at the time of his fourteenth birthday, when his mother gave his, as a birthday present, a small German battery-operated motor. While still on the Oakland High School, he became a licensed radio operator in 1911 and upon the graduation, Stone enrolled the University of California, Los Angeles, where he studied radio engineering.

Stone left the college in early 1914 and applied for job as Assistant Radio Inspectors within the United States Department of Commerce. He was selected and served in that capacity in San Francisco, while he was responsible for inspection of all U.S. ships registered that came to San Francisco of U.S. register once a year. Shortly before the United States entry into World War I in April 1917, all regulation of radio communications passed under the control of the United States Navy. Stone was offered whether he want to be transferred to the Army Signal Corps or the Navy Communications Service. Stone chose the Navy and was commissioned Lieutenant (junior grade) on March 16, 1917.

He was subsequently assigned to the headquarters of the Twelfth Naval District at Mare Island Naval Shipyard in Vallejo, California, and assumed duty as Assistant District Communications Superintendent under Captain Robert Lee Russell. Stone remained in that capacity for the duration of the war and was promoted to Lieutenant. In early 1919, he was ordered to the receiving ship at San Francisco for an administrative job handling personnel, who were mostly getting out of the Navy following the war and held that job until the end of year, when he was transferred to the inactive list of the Navy.

== Interwar period ==
Stone began working for Kilburn and Clark Manufacturing Company, who had opened a San Francisco office, selling sets sending and receiving equipment for ships. He also retained his commission as a member of the United States Naval Reserve, where he served for next three decades, reaching the rank of Commander. He was president of the Federal Telegraph Company from 1924 to 1931, when ITT acquired the company together with the Mackay corporations.

== World War II ==
Following the outbreak of World War II in Europe in September 1939, Stone tried to get on active duty, but was rejected several times due to his position as President and Director of the Postal Telegraph Company, which was considered important for the war effort. However, he was able to be recalled for a brief periods of active duty for two weeks during 1941; three weeks in 1942 and couple of months in 1943, serving consecutively in the Communications-Liaison Reserve of the Office of Naval Communications under Rear admiral Leigh Noyes and on the headquarters of Eastern Sea Frontier under Vice admiral Adolphus Andrews. While in Washington, D.C., Stone met his old friend, Vice admiral William A. Glassford, who was ordered by President Franklin Roosevelt to be Head of the U.S. Military Mission to Dakar, French West Africa.

Stone was finally recalled to active duty in May 1943 as Captain and appointed Chief of Staff to Admiral Glassford. He accompanied him to Liberia and remained there until November that year, when he was appointed Chief of Communications of the Allied Commission for Italy under Major general Kenyon A. Joyce. The commission was responsible for the supervision that all Italian economic resources and manpower are utilized for the most efficient use in the fight against Nazi Germany. Stone was directly responsible for the planning, coordination and execution of the restoration of communications in liberated Italy.

He later served under british lieutenant general Noel Mason-MacFarlane, who succeeded Joyce, and was appointed Vice President and Deputy Chief Commissioner of the Allied Commission. Within this capacity, Stone was promoted to Rear admiral in June 1944 and appointed Chief Commissioner of the Allied Commission. He was senior representative of the Allied Control Commission at Salerno, then the seat of the Italian government in liberated territory and dealt directly with the Italian government and was responsible for terms and for the insurance that the Italian government's conduct would conform to the requirements of an Allied base of operations. For his service in this capacity, Stone was decorated with Army Distinguished Service Medal and also received several foreign decorations from Italy, San Marino, United Kingdom, France and Belgium.

== Postwar career ==
Following the surrender of Nazi Germany in May 1945, Stone was given additional duty as Chief Civil Affairs Officer of Occupied Territory under Allied Military Government in Italy. He had full executive responsibility for the activities of the Allied Commission in connection with all relations with the government of Italy, the interpretation and execution of the surrender terms between the Allied Nations and the Italian government and the supervision of the many involved aspects of civil affairs within those parts of Italy under Allied Military Government. In the execution of his duties Stone was called upon to coordinate the activities of various nations, to face and solve the most difficult political problems and to represent the Allied Nations before the Italian people. He remained in that assignment until May 1946 and received Navy Distinguished Service Medal.

Stone then served with the Italian Naval Branch, Allied Force Headquarters, Italy, until May 1947, when he was ordered back to the United States for temporary duty under Chief of Naval Operations pending separation from active duty.

He then assumed job as the head of the Commercial Cable Company, a subsidiary of the International Telephone and Telegraph corporation, and later oversaw its American Cable and Radio Corporation division until 1958. Stone later served as Vice President of International Telephone and Telegraph and retired in 1969.

Rear admiral Ellery W. Stone died on September 18, 1981, aged 87 in Montclair, New Jersey, and was buried with full military honors at Arlington National Cemetery, Virginia.

== Awards and decorations ==
Here is the ribbon bar of Rear admiral Stone:

1st Row	Navy Distinguished Service Medal		Army Distinguished Service Medal
2nd Row	World War I Victory Medal	American Defense Service Medal	American Campaign Medal
3rd Row	European-African-Middle Eastern Campaign Medal with two 3/16 inch service stars	World War II Victory Medal	Knight Commander of the Order of the British Empire
4th Row	Officer of the Legion of Honour (France)	Commander of the Order of Leopold (Belgium)	Grand Officer of the Order of the Crown of Italy
5th Row	Knight of the Grand Cross of the Order of Saints Maurice and Lazarus (Italy)	Knight of Grand Cross of the Order of San Marino	Sovereign Military Order of Malta, 1st Class
