= Arc converter =

Variety of spark transmitter

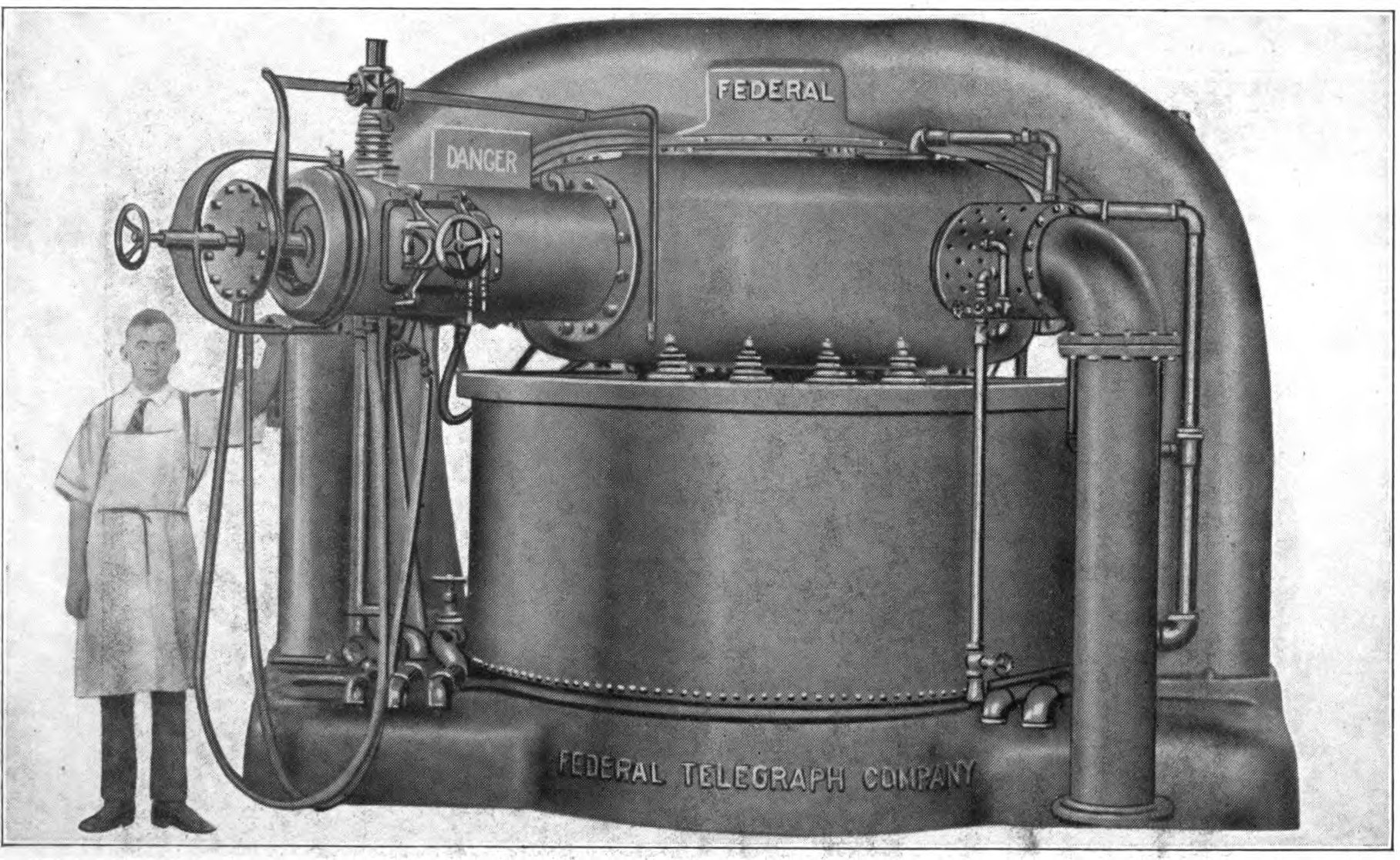
1 megawatt Poulsen arc transmitter used by the U.S. Navy around 1918 in shore radio stations to communicate with its fleet worldwide, one of the largest arc transmitters ever built.

The arc converter, sometimes called the arc transmitter, or Poulsen arc after Danish engineer Valdemar Poulsen who invented it in 1903, was a variety of spark transmitter used in early wireless telegraphy. The arc converter used an electric arc to convert direct current electricity into radio frequency alternating current. It was used as a radio transmitter from 1903 until the 1920s when it was replaced by vacuum tube transmitters. One of the first transmitters that could generate continuous sinusoidal waves, it was one of the first technologies used to transmit sound (amplitude modulation) by radio. It is on the list of IEEE Milestones as a historic achievement in electrical engineering.

== History ==
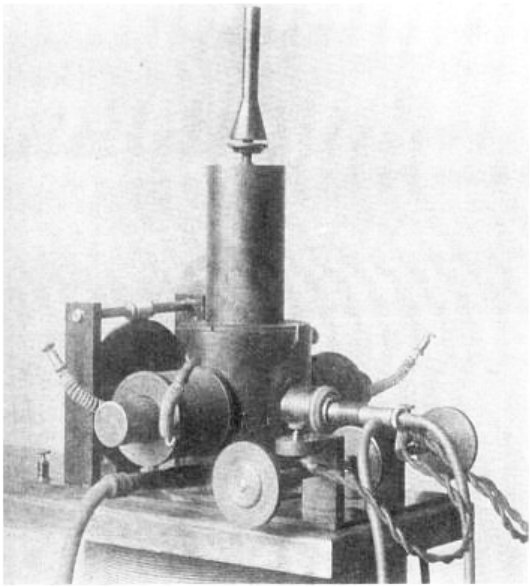
Poulsen's first arc converter, from 1903

In 1892, Elihu Thomson filed a patent application for generating high frequency current of up to 50 kHz, from direct current, using an electric arc. In 1900, William Duddell demonstrated the "singing arc", by shunting a tuned resonant circuit across the arc. Valdemar Poulsen succeeded in raising the efficiency by having the arc burn in hydrogen vapor instead of air, and achieved frequencies of 150 kHz.

By 1903, Poulsen and Peder Oluf Pedersen had developed a workable continuous wave radio system for telephony and telegraphy. A syndicate was formed in Copenhagen, and 1906 a station was established in Lyngby. In 1906, the patent rights were acquired by the Amalgamated Radio Telegraph Company, and a station established in Cullercoats. In 1907, the rights were acquired by C. Lorenz AG who established a station at Weissensee (Berlin). By 1908 this station was transmitting speech and music with Lyngby. In 1909, Cyril Frank Elwell formed the Poulsen Wireless Telephone and Telegraph Company, and by 1910, stations in Sacramento and Stockton, California were in communication. Then a manufacturing facility was established in Palo Alto, and in 1913, the US Navy ordered a 100 kilowatt arc. In 1911, Beach Thompson took over the company and renamed it the Federal Telegraph Company, and the transmitters became known as Federal arcs. By 1912, the company had established thirteen stations on the west coast, plus Chicago, Kansas City and Fort Worth, with a relay station in Phoenix.

In 1922, the Bureau of Standards stated, "the arc is the most widely used transmitting apparatus for high-power, long-distance work. It is estimated that the arc is now responsible for 80 per cent of all the energy actually radiated into space for radio purposes during a given time, leaving amateur stations out of consideration."

== Description ==
This new, more-refined method for generating continuous-wave radio signals was initially developed by Danish inventor Valdemar Poulsen. The spark-gap transmitters in use at that time produced damped wave which wasted a large portion of their radiated power transmitting strong harmonics on multiple frequencies that filled the RF spectrum with interference. Poulsen's arc converter produced undamped or continuous waves (CW) on a single frequency.

There are three types for an arc oscillator:

Duddell arc (and other early types)
In the first type of arc oscillator, the AC current in the condenser i_{0} is much smaller than the DC supply current i_{1}, and the arc is never extinguished during an output cycle. The Duddell arc is an example of the first type, but the first type is not practical for RF transmitters.

Poulsen arc
In the second type of arc oscillator, the condenser AC discharge current is large enough to extinguish the arc but not large enough to restart the arc in the opposite direction. This second type is the Poulsen arc.

Quenched spark gap
In the third type of arc oscillator, the arc extinguishes but may reignite when the condenser current reverses. The third case is a quenched spark gap and produces damped oscillations.

Continuous or ‘undamped’ waves (CW) were an important feature, since the use of damped waves from spark-gap transmitters resulted in lower transmitter efficiency and communications effectiveness, while polluting the RF spectrum with interference.

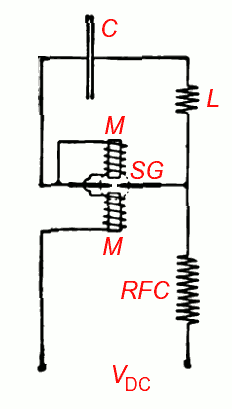
Circuit of basic arc converter, from Poulsen's 1904 paper (labels added).

The Poulsen arc converter had a tuned circuit connected across the arc. The arc converter consisted of a chamber in which the arc burned in hydrogen gas between a carbon cathode and a water-cooled copper anode. Above and below this chamber there were two series field coils surrounding and energizing the two poles of the magnetic circuit. These poles projected into the chamber, one on each side of the arc to provide a magnetic field.

It was most successful when operated in the frequency range of a few kilohertz to a few tens of kilohertz. The antenna tuning had to be selective enough to suppress the arc converter's harmonics.

== Keying ==
Since the arc took some time to strike and operate in a stable fashion, normal on-off keying could not be used. Instead, a form of frequency-shift keying was employed. In this compensation-wave method, the arc operated continuously, and the key altered the frequency of the arc by one to five percent. The signal at the unwanted frequency was called the compensation-wave. In arc transmitters up to 70 kW, the key typically shorted out a few turns in the antenna coil. For larger arcs, the arc output would be transformer coupled to the antenna inductor, and the key would short out a few bottom turns of the grounded secondary. Therefore, the "mark" (key closed) was sent at one frequency, and the "space" (key open) at another frequency. If these frequencies were far enough apart, and the receiving station's receiver had adequate selectivity, the receiving station would hear standard CW when tuned to the "mark" frequency.

The compensation wave method used a lot of spectrum bandwidth. It not only transmitted on the two intended frequencies, but also the harmonics of those frequencies. Arc converters are rich in harmonics. Sometime around 1921, the Preliminary International Communications Conference prohibited the compensation wave method because it caused too much interference.

The need for the emission of signals at two different frequencies was eliminated by the development of uniwave methods. In one uniwave method, called the ignition method, keying would start and stop the arc. The arc chamber would have a striker rod that shorted out the two electrodes through a resistor and extinguished the arc. The key would energize an electromagnet that would move the striker and reignite the arc. For this method to work, the arc chamber had to be hot. The method was feasible for arc converters up to about 5 kW.

The second uniwave method is the absorption method, and it involves two tuned circuits and a single-pole, double-throw, make-before-break key. When the key is down, the arc is connected to the tuned antenna coil and antenna. When the key is up, the arc is connected to a tuned dummy antenna called the back shunt. The back shunt was a second tuned circuit consisting of an inductor, a capacitor, and load resistor in series. This second circuit is tuned to roughly the same frequency as the transmitted frequency; it keeps the arc running, and it absorbs the transmitter power. The absorption method is apparently due to W. A. Eaton.

The design of switching circuit for the absorption method is significant. It is switching a high voltage arc, so the switch's contacts must have some form of arc suppression. Eaton had the telegraph key drive electromagnets that operated a relay. That relay used four sets of switch contacts in series for each of the two paths (one to the antenna and one to the back shunt). Each relay contact was bridged by a resistor. Consequently, the switch was never completely open, but there was a lot of attenuation.

== See also ==
- History of radio
- Transmitter
- Mercury arc valve
- Tikker
