= DeForest Radio Company =

American company (1906–1932)

The DeForest Radio Company was the final name, used beginning in 1924, for a company that traced its history to 1906, when inventor Lee de Forest founded the Radio Telephone Company. Following numerous reorganizations and name changes, the company went into receivership in 1932 and was liquidated the next year. Its assets and former employees were primarily acquired by the Radio Corporation of America (RCA) and Hygrade Sylvania.

== History ==
Lee de Forest was an American inventor, and one of the first to become interested in the potential of radio (originally known as "wireless telegraphy") communication. His first major sponsor was promoter Abraham White, who formed the American De Forest Wireless Telegraph Company. De Forest severed this contact because of the limited support he got for conducting research, while company officials were upset with de Forest's inability to develop a practical receiver free of patent infringement. On November 28, 1906, in exchange for $1,000 (half of which was claimed by an attorney) and the rights to some early Audion detector patents, de Forest turned in his stock and resigned.

=== Radio Telephone Company ===
De Forest moved quickly to re-establish himself as an independent inventor, working in his own laboratory in the Parker Building in New York City. The Radio Telephone Company was incorporated to promote his inventions, with James Dunlop Smith, a former American DeForest salesman, as president, and de Forest the vice president.

=== Arc radiotelephone development ===
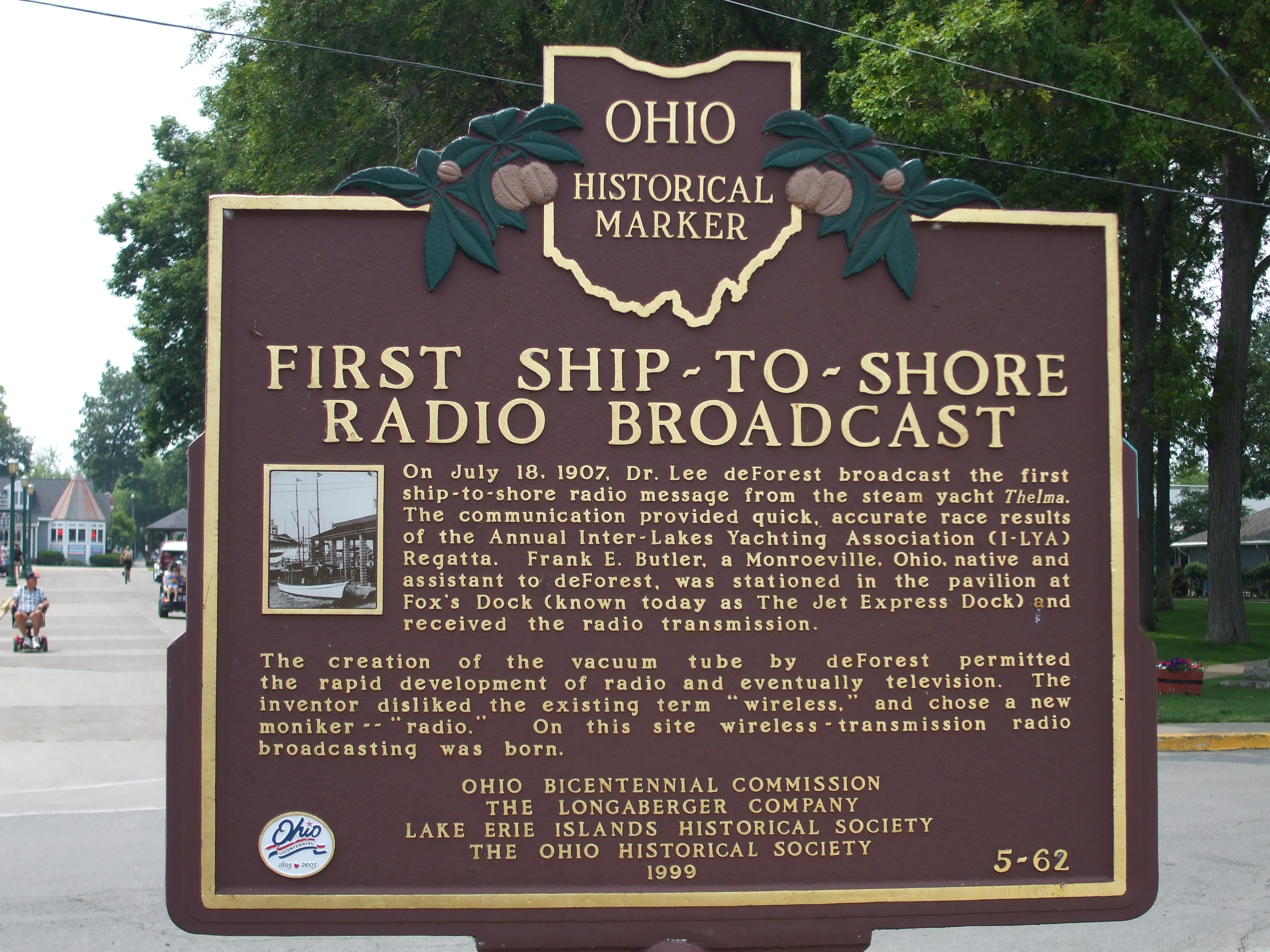
Ohio Historical Marker: On July 18, 1907, Lee de Forest transmitted the first ship-to-shore messages that were sent by radiotelephone.

At the 1904 Louisiana Purchase Exposition, Valdemar Poulsen had presented a paper on an arc transmitter, which unlike the discontinuous pulses produced by spark transmitters, created steady "continuous wave" signals that could be used for amplitude modulated (AM) audio transmissions. Although Poulsen had patented his invention, de Forest claimed to have come up with a variation that allowed him to avoid infringing on Poulsen's work. Using his "sparkless" arc transmitter, de Forest first transmitted audio across a lab room on December 31, 1906, and by February was making experimental transmissions, including music produced by Thaddeus Cahill's telharmonium, that were heard throughout the city.

On July 18, 1907, de Forest made the first ship-to-shore transmissions by radiotelephone, consisting of race reports for the Annual Inter-Lakes Yachting Association Regatta held on Lake Erie, which were sent from the steam yacht Thelma to his assistant, Frank E. Butler, located in the Fox's Dock Pavilion on South Bass Island. De Forest also interested the U.S. Navy in his radiotelephone, which placed a rush order to have 26 sets installed for its Great White Fleet around-the-world voyage that began in late 1907. However, at the conclusion of the circumnavigation, the sets were declared to be too unreliable to meet the Navy's needs and removed.

The company set up a network of radiotelephone stations along the Atlantic Coast and the Great Lakes, for coastal ship navigation, but the installations proved unprofitable, and by 1911, the parent company and its subsidiaries were on the brink of bankruptcy.

=== Initial broadcasting experiments ===
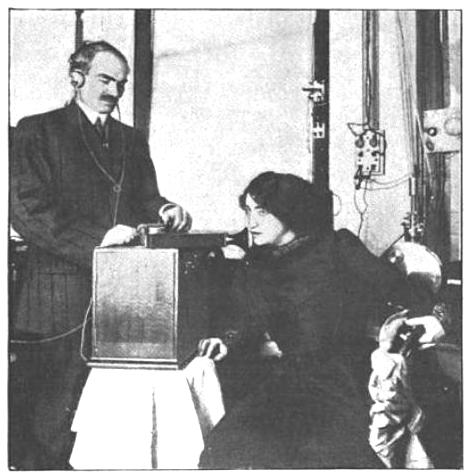
February 24, 1910 radio broadcast by Mme. Mariette Mazarin of the Manhattan Opera Company

De Forest also used the arc transmitter to conduct some of the earliest experimental entertainment broadcasts. Eugenia Farrar sang "I Love You Truly" in an unpublicized test from his laboratory in 1907, and in 1908, on de Forest's Paris honeymoon, musical selections were broadcast from the Eiffel Tower as a part of demonstrations of the arc transmitter. In early 1909, in what may have been the first public speech by radio, de Forest's mother-in-law, Harriot Stanton Blatch, made a broadcast supporting women's suffrage.

More ambitious demonstrations followed, including a series of tests in conjunction with the Metropolitan Opera House in New York City which were conducted to determine whether broadcasting opera performances live from the stage would be practical. Tosca was performed on January 12, 1910, and the next day's test included Italian tenor Enrico Caruso. On February 24, the Manhattan Opera Company's Mme. Mariette Mazarin sang "La Habanera" from Carmen and selections from Elektra over a transmitter located in de Forest's lab, but the tests showed that the idea was not yet technically feasible, and de Forest did not make any additional entertainment broadcasts until late 1916, when more capable vacuum-tube equipment became available.

=== Renewed broadcasting activities ===
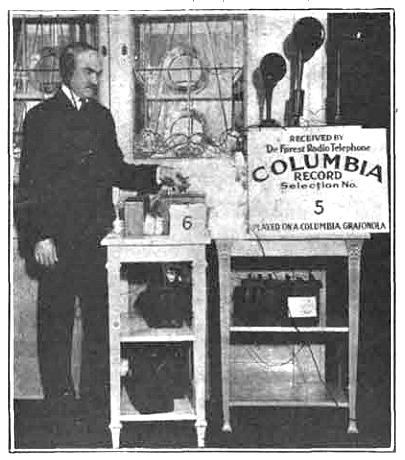
De Forest broadcasting Columbia phonograph records (October 1916)

In the summer of 1915, the company, now known as the Radio Telephone & Telegraph Company, received an experimental license for station 2XG, located at its Highbridge laboratory. In late 1916, de Forest renewed the entertainment broadcasts he had suspended in 1910, now using the superior capabilities of vacuum-tube equipment. 2XG's debut program aired on October 26, 1916, as part of an arrangement with the Columbia Graphophone Company to promote its recordings. These broadcasts included "announcing the title and 'Columbia Gramophone [sic] Company' with each playing".

Beginning November 1, the "Highbridge Station" offered a nightly schedule featuring the Columbia recordings. These broadcasts were also initially used to advertise "the products of the DeForest Radio Co., mostly the radio parts, with all the zeal of our catalogue and price list", until comments by Western Electric engineers caused de Forest enough embarrassment to lead to the elimination of the direct advertising. The station also made the first audio broadcast of election reports—in earlier elections, stations that broadcast results had used Morse code—providing news of the November 1916 Wilson-Hughes presidential election. The New York American installed a private wire and bulletins were sent out every hour. About 2,000 listeners heard The Star-Spangled Banner and other anthems, songs, hymns, and an incorrect report that Hughes had won.

With the entry of the United States into World War I on April 6, 1917, all civilian radio stations were ordered to shut down, so 2XG was silenced for the duration of the war. The ban on civilian stations was lifted on October 1, 1919, and 2XG soon renewed operation, with the Brunswick-Balke-Collender company now supplying the phonograph records. In early 1920, de Forest moved the station's transmitter from the Bronx to Manhattan, but had not received permission to do so, so district Radio Inspector Arthur Batcheller ordered the station off the air. De Forest's response was to return to San Francisco in March, taking 2XG's transmitter with him. A new station, 6XC, was established as "The California Theater station", which de Forest later stated was the "first radio-telephone station devoted solely" to broadcasting to the public. There were also live performances, including multiple appearances by Vaughn De Leath—for these broadcasts she earned the sobriquet "The Original Radio Girl".

Later that year, a de Forest associate, Clarence "C.S." Thompson, established Radio News & Music, Inc., to lease DeForest radio transmitters to newspapers interested in establishing broadcasting stations. On August 20, 1920, the Detroit News began operation of the Detroit News Radiophone as amateur station 8MK, which later became broadcasting station WWJ

The De Forest company eventually returned to the New York City airwaves on a more limited basis. In December 1920, Vaughn De Leath made a return engagement of weekly concerts, and the next month there was a report that the De Forest laboratories were broadcasting a nightly concert between 7:30 and 8:30. However, audio transmission and broadcasting experimentation by the company was now primarily conducted through experimental station 2XX, located at the home of De Forest's Chief Engineer, Robert Gowen, in Ossining, New York.

On October 13, 1921, the De Forest Radio Telephone & Telegraph Company, was issued a broadcasting station authorization in the form of a Limited Commercial license with the randomly assigned call letters WJX, operating on 360 meters (833 kilohertz) at its Sedgwick Avenue facility. This was the first broadcasting license issued for a station in New York City proper; however, despite its heritage, there was minimal, if any, programming ever broadcast by WJX. Effective December 1, 1921, the 360-meter wavelength was designated as the common "entertainment" broadcasting wavelength, and stations within a region had to devise timesharing agreements to allocate the hours during which they could operate. A mid-1922 agreement covering the New York City area did not even list WJX as being active. WJX continued to be included in the official government lists of stations holding licenses through early 1924, but contemporary newspapers and magazines providing station programming information do not contain any evidence that the station was actually on the air. In June 1924, WJX (along with 2XG) was officially deleted by the government.

DeForest Company Operations

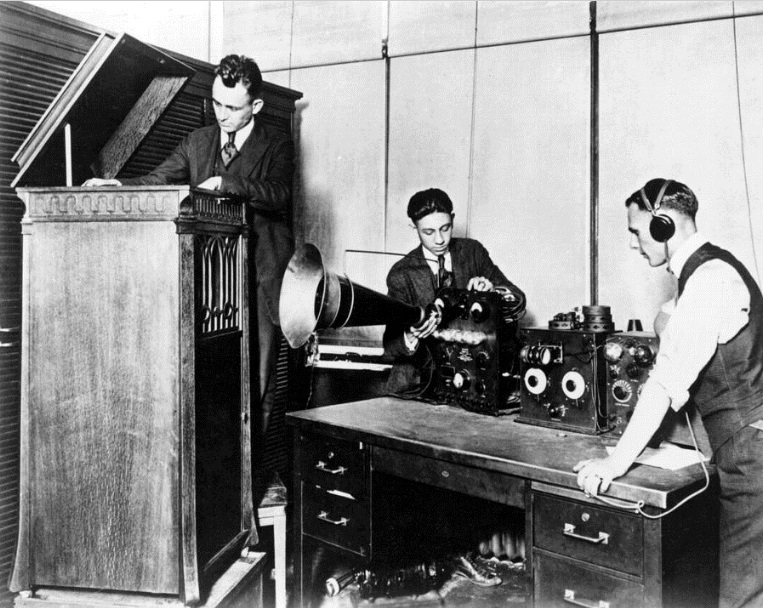
1920 8MK (Detroit News Radiophone) publicity photograph, operating a DeForest OT-10 transmitter (center).

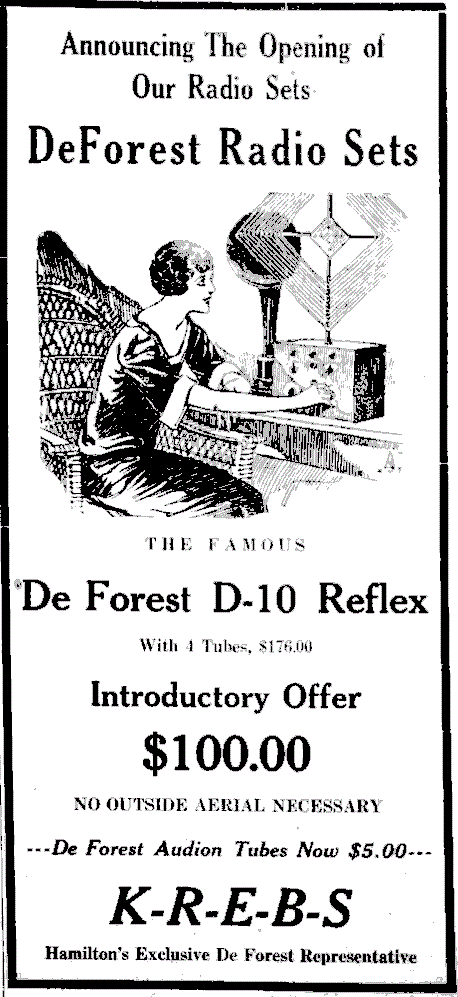
1924 radio receiver advertisement.

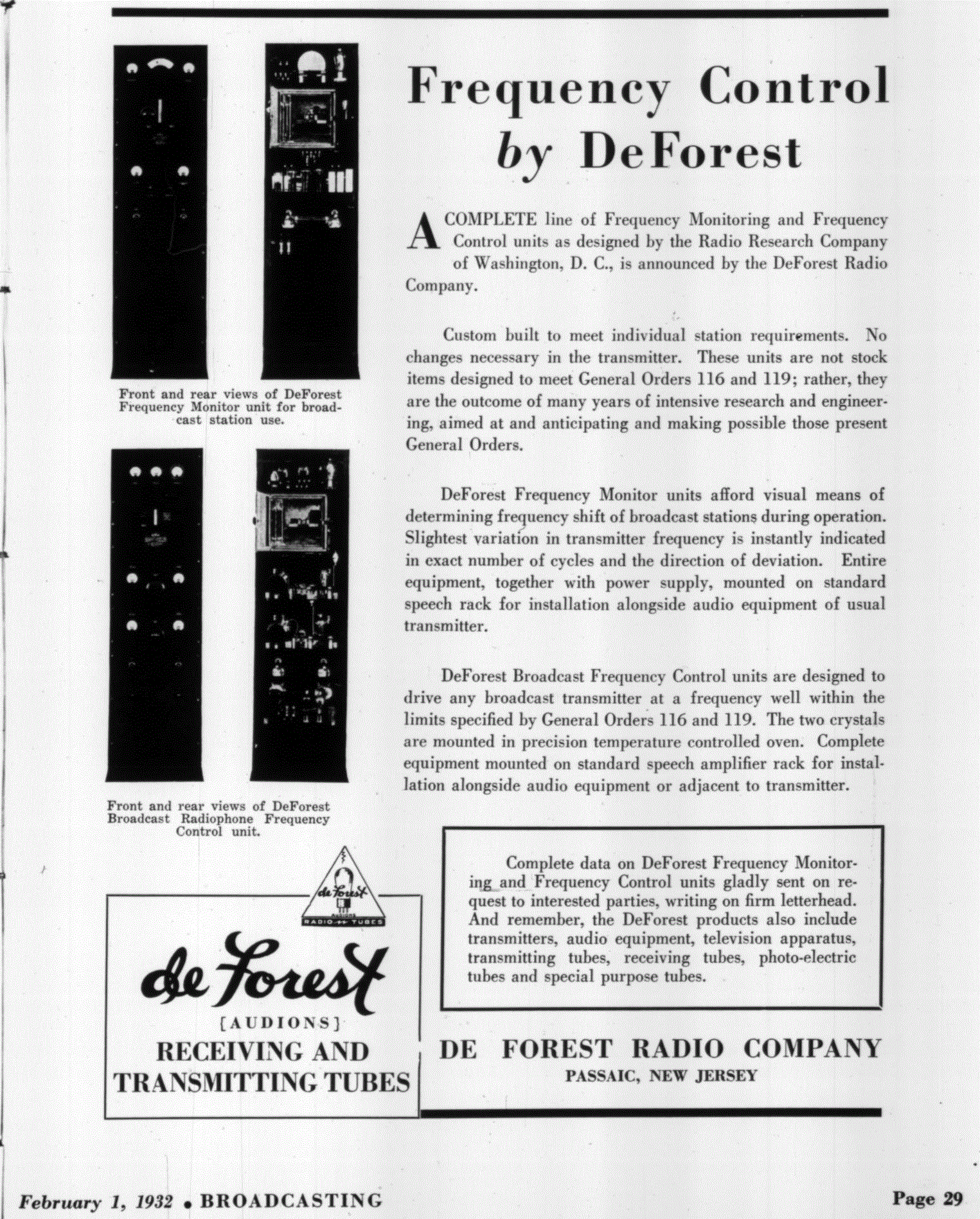
1932 DeForest Radio Company advertisement.

Lee de Forest eventually ceased involvement with radio work altogether, in order to concentrate on developing the Phonofilm sound-on-film system, and in 1923 sold controlling interest in the DeForest Radio Telephone & Telegraph Company to Edward H. Jewett, who became company president, replacing Charles M. Gilbert, who became vice president and treasurer. The next year, the company name was shortened to the DeForest Radio Company, and capitalization was increased from 2.5 to 25 million dollars.

=== Liquidation ===
In the summer of 1932, the company was found to be insolvent, and was ordered to be liquidated. Company president Leslie S. Gorden, and Ralph E. Lum, general counsel for the Firemen's Insurance Company, were appointed as receivers. RCA's bid of $400,000 for most of the company's assets was chosen as the best offer.

The only other company to bid on the DeForest assets, Hygrade Sylvania, advertised it had formed an Electronics Department, "composed of William J. Barkley, General Manager; D. F. Replogle, Chief Engineer; Victor O. Allen, Assistant Chief Engineer; and 22 other electronics engineers and executives, all formerly associated with the DeForest Radio Company".
