= Lee de Forest =

American inventor (1873–1961)

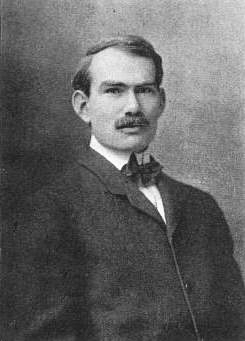
- Lee de Forest c. 1904
- Born: August 26, 1873; Council Bluffs, Iowa, U.S.
- Died: June 30, 1961 (aged 87); Hollywood, California, U.S.
- Education: Yale College (Sheffield Scientific School)
- Occupation: Inventor
- Known for: Three-electrode vacuum-tube (Audion), sound-on-film recording (Phonofilm)
- Spouses: Lucille Sheardown (m. 1906; div. 1906) Nora Stanton Blatch Barney (m. 1908; div. 1911) Mary Mayo (m. 1912; div. 1923) Marie Mosquini (m. 1930)
- Awards: IEEE Medal of Honor (1922); Elliott Cresson Medal (1923); IEEE Edison Medal (1946); Audio Engineering Society Gold Medal Award (1955)

Lee de Forest (August 26, 1873 – June 30, 1961) was an American inventor, electrical engineer, and early pioneer in electronics of fundamental importance. He invented the first practical electronic amplifier, the three-element "Audion" triode vacuum tube in 1908. This helped start the Electronic Age, and enabled the development of the electronic oscillator. These made radio broadcasting and long-distance telephone lines possible, and led to the development of talking motion pictures, among countless other applications.

He had over 300 patents worldwide, but also a tumultuous career – he boasted that he made, then lost, four fortunes. He was also involved in several major patent lawsuits, spent a substantial part of his income on legal bills, and was even tried (and acquitted) for mail fraud.

He was recognized for his pioneering work with the 1922 IRE Medal of Honor, the 1923 Franklin Institute Elliott Cresson Medal, and the 1946 American Institute of Electrical Engineers Edison Medal.

== Early life ==
Lee de Forest was born in 1873 in Council Bluffs, Iowa, the son of Anna Margaret (née Robbins) and Henry Swift DeForest. He was a direct descendant of Jessé de Forest, the leader of a group of Walloon Huguenots who fled Europe in the 17th century due to religious persecution.

De Forest's father was a Congregational Church minister who hoped his son would also become a pastor. In 1879, the elder de Forest became president of the American Missionary Association's Talladega College in Talladega, Alabama, a school "open to all of either sex, without regard to sect, race, or color", and which educated primarily African Americans. Many of the local white citizens resented the school and its mission, and Lee spent most of his youth in Talladega isolated from the white community, with several close friends among the black children of the town.

De Forest prepared for college by attending Mount Hermon Boys' School in Gill, Massachusetts, for two years, beginning in 1891. In 1893, he enrolled in a three-year course of studies at Yale University's Sheffield Scientific School in New Haven, Connecticut, on a $300 per year scholarship that had been established for relatives of David de Forest. Convinced that he was destined to become a famous – and rich – inventor, and perpetually short of funds, he sought to interest companies with a series of devices and puzzles he created, and expectantly submitted essays in prize competitions, all with little success.

After completing his undergraduate studies, de Forest began three years of postgraduate work in September 1896. His electrical experiments had a tendency to blow fuses, though, causing building-wide blackouts. Even after being warned to be more careful, he managed to douse the lights during an important lecture by Professor Charles S. Hastings, who responded by having de Forest expelled from Sheffield.

With the outbreak of the Spanish–American War in 1898, de Forest enrolled in the Connecticut Volunteer Militia Battery as a bugler, but the war ended, and he was mustered out without ever leaving the state. He then completed his studies at Yale's Sloane Physics Laboratory, earning a doctorate in 1899 with a dissertation on the "Reflection of Hertzian Waves from the Ends of Parallel Wires", supervised by theoretical physicist Willard Gibbs.

== Early radio work ==
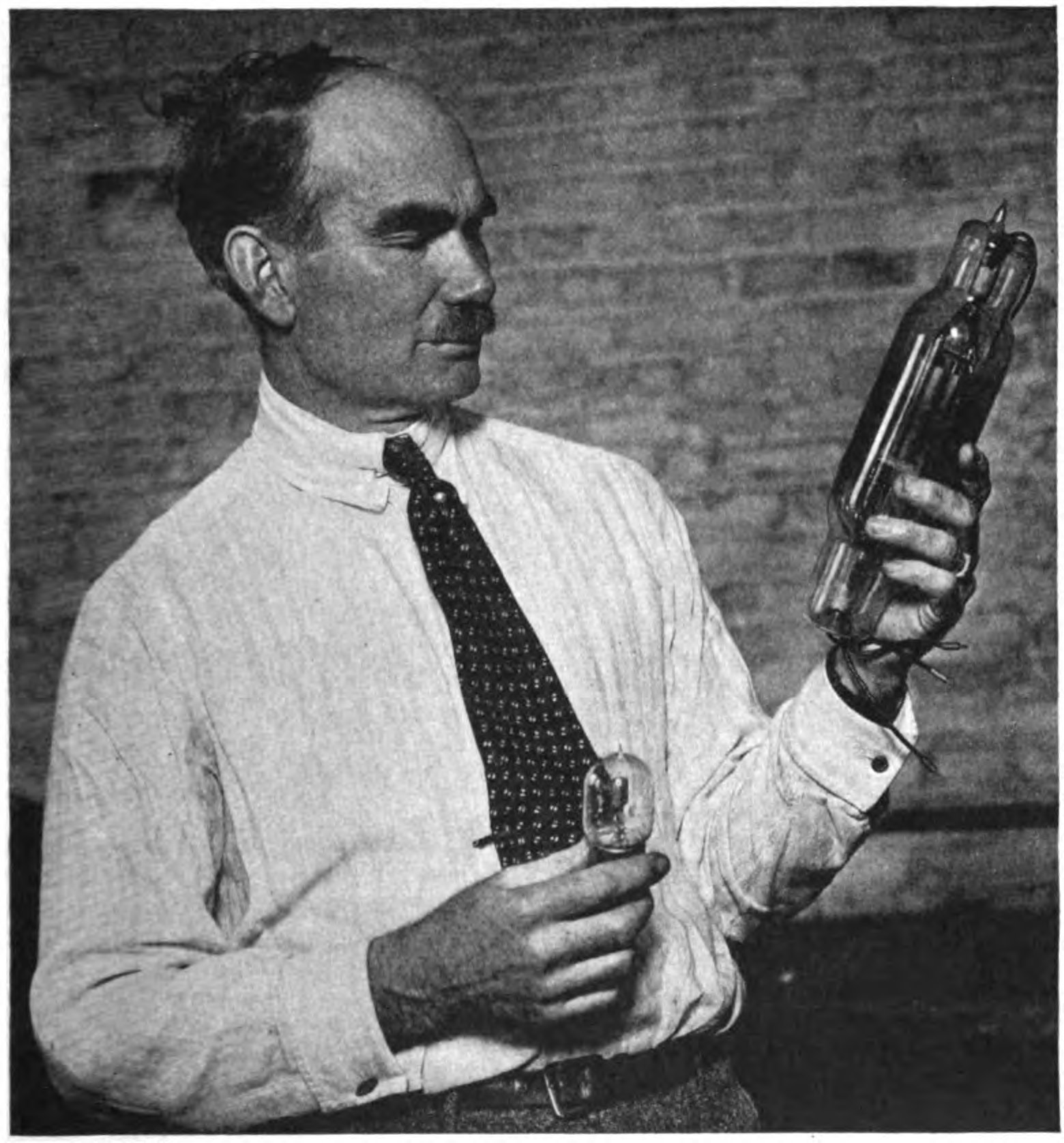
De Forest, some time between 1914 and 1922, with two of his Audions, a small 1-watt receiving tube (left), and a later 250-watt transmitting power tube (right), which he called an "oscillion".

Reflecting his pioneering work, de Forest has sometimes been credited as the "Father of Radio", an honorific which he adopted as the title of his 1950 autobiography. In the late 1800s, he became convinced a great future in radiotelegraphic communication (then known as "wireless telegraphy") was in store, but Italian Guglielmo Marconi, who received his first patent in 1896, was already making impressive progress in both Europe and the United States. One drawback of Marconi's approach was his use of a coherer as a receiver, which, while providing for permanent records, was also slow (after each received Morse code dot or dash, it had to be tapped to restore operation), insensitive, and not very reliable. De Forest was determined to devise a better system, including a self-restoring detector that could receive transmissions by ear, thus making it capable of receiving weaker signals and also allowing faster Morse code sending speeds.

After making unsuccessful inquiries about employment with Nikola Tesla and Marconi, de Forest struck out on his own. His first job after leaving Yale was with the Western Electric Company's telephone lab in Chicago, Illinois. While there he developed his first receiver, which was based on findings by two German scientists, Drs. A. Neugschwender and Emil Aschkinass. Their original design consisted of a mirror in which a narrow, moistened slit had been cut through the silvered back. Attaching a battery and telephone receiver, they could hear sound changes in response to radio signal impulses. De Forest, along with Ed Smythe, a co-worker who provided financial and technical help, developed variations they called "responders".

A series of short-term positions followed, including three unproductive months with Professor Warren S. Johnson's American Wireless Telegraph Company in Milwaukee, Wisconsin, and work as an assistant editor of the Western Electrician in Chicago. With radio research his main priority, de Forest next took a night teaching position at the Lewis Institute, which freed him to conduct experiments at the Armour Institute. By 1900, using a spark-coil transmitter and his responder receiver, de Forest expanded his transmitting range to about 7 km (4 mi). Professor Clarence Freeman of the Armour Institute became interested in de Forest's work and developed a new type of spark transmitter.

De Forest soon felt that Smythe and Freeman were holding him back, so in the fall of 1901, he made the bold decision to go to New York state to compete directly with Marconi in transmitting race results for the International Yacht races. Marconi had already made arrangements to provide reports for the Associated Press, which he had successfully done for the 1899 contest. De Forest contracted to do the same for the smaller Publishers' Press Association.

The race effort turned out to be an almost total failure. The Freeman transmitter broke down—in a fit of rage, de Forest threw it overboard—and had to be replaced by an ordinary spark coil. Even worse, the American Wireless Telephone and Telegraph Company, which claimed its ownership of Amos Dolbear's 1886 patent for wireless communication meant it held a monopoly for all wireless communication in the United States, had also set up a powerful transmitter. None of these companies had effective tuning for their transmitters, so only one could transmit at a time without causing mutual interference. Although an attempt was made to have the three systems avoid conflicts by rotating operations over five-minute intervals, the agreement broke down, resulting in chaos as the simultaneous transmissions clashed with each other. De Forest ruefully noted that under these conditions, the only successful "wireless" communication was done by visual semaphore "wig-wag" flags. (The 1903 International Yacht races would be a repeat of 1901—Marconi worked for the Associated Press, de Forest for the Publishers' Press Association, and the unaffiliated International Wireless Company (successor to 1901's American Wireless Telephone and Telegraph) operated a high-powered transmitter that was used primarily to drown out the other two. "Instead of receiving reports of the positions of the yachts, they got a lot of meaningless gabble varied by a hash of obscenity, profanity, and sentimental poetry.")

== American De Forest Wireless Telegraph Company ==
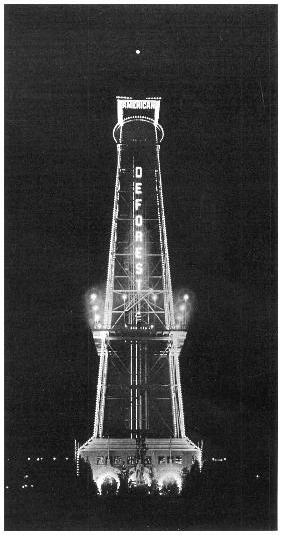
American DeForest Wireless Telegraph Company's observation tower, 1904 Louisiana Purchase Exposition at Saint Louis, Missouri

Despite this setback, de Forest remained in the New York City area to raise interest in his ideas and capital to replace the small working companies that had been formed to promote his work thus far. In January 1902, he met a promoter, Abraham White, who would become de Forest's main sponsor for the next five years. White envisioned bold and expansive plans that enticed the inventor; however, he was also dishonest and much of the new enterprise would be built on wild exaggeration and stock fraud. To back de Forest's efforts, White incorporated the American DeForest Wireless Telegraph Company, with himself as the company's president and de Forest the scientific director. The company claimed as its goal the development of "world-wide wireless".

The original "responder" receiver (also known as the "goo anti-coherer") proved to be too crude to be commercialized, and de Forest struggled to develop a noninfringing device for receiving radio signals. In 1903, Reginald Fessenden demonstrated an electrolytic detector, and de Forest developed a variation, which he called the "spade detector", claiming it did not infringe on Fessenden's patents. Fessenden, and the U.S. courts, did not agree, and court injunctions enjoined American De Forest from using the device.

Meanwhile, White set in motion a series of highly visible promotions for American DeForest: "Wireless Auto No.1" was positioned on Wall Street to "send stock quotes" using an unmuffled spark transmitter to loudly draw the attention of potential investors; in early 1904 two stations were established at Weihaiwei in China and aboard the Chinese steamer SS Haimun, which allowed war correspondent Captain Lionel James of The Times of London to report on the brewing Russo-Japanese War, and later that year, a tower, with "DEFOREST" arrayed in lights, was erected on the grounds of the Louisiana Purchase Exposition in Saint Louis, Missouri, where the company won a gold medal for its radiotelegraph demonstrations. (Marconi withdrew from the exposition when he learned de Forest would be there).

The company's most important early contract was the construction, in 1905–1906, of five high-powered radiotelegraph stations for the U.S. Navy, located in Panama, Pensacola, and Key West, Florida; Guantanamo, Cuba; and Puerto Rico. It also installed shore stations along the Atlantic Coast and Great Lakes and equipped shipboard stations. Its main focus, though, was selling stock at ever more inflated prices, spurred by the construction of promotional inland stations. Most of these inland stations had no practical use and were abandoned once the local stock sales slowed.

De Forest eventually came into conflict with his company's management. His main complaint was the limited support he got for conducting research, while company officials were upset with de Forest's inability to develop a practical receiver free of patent infringement. (This problem was finally resolved with the invention of the carborundum crystal detector by another company employee, General Henry Harrison Chase Dunwoody). On November 28, 1906, in exchange for $1000 (half of which was claimed by an attorney) and the rights to some early Audion detector patents, de Forest turned in his stock and resigned from the company that bore his name. American DeForest was then reorganized as the United Wireless Telegraph Company, and would be the dominant U.S. radio communications firm, albeit propped up by massive stock fraud, until its bankruptcy in 1912.

== Radio Telephone Company ==
De Forest moved quickly to re-establish himself as an independent inventor, working in his own laboratory in the Parker Building in New York City. The Radio Telephone Company was incorporated to promote his inventions, with James Dunlop Smith, a former American DeForest salesman, as president, and de Forest the vice president (De Forest preferred the term radio, which up to now had been primarily used in Europe, over Wireless).

=== Arc radiotelephone development ===
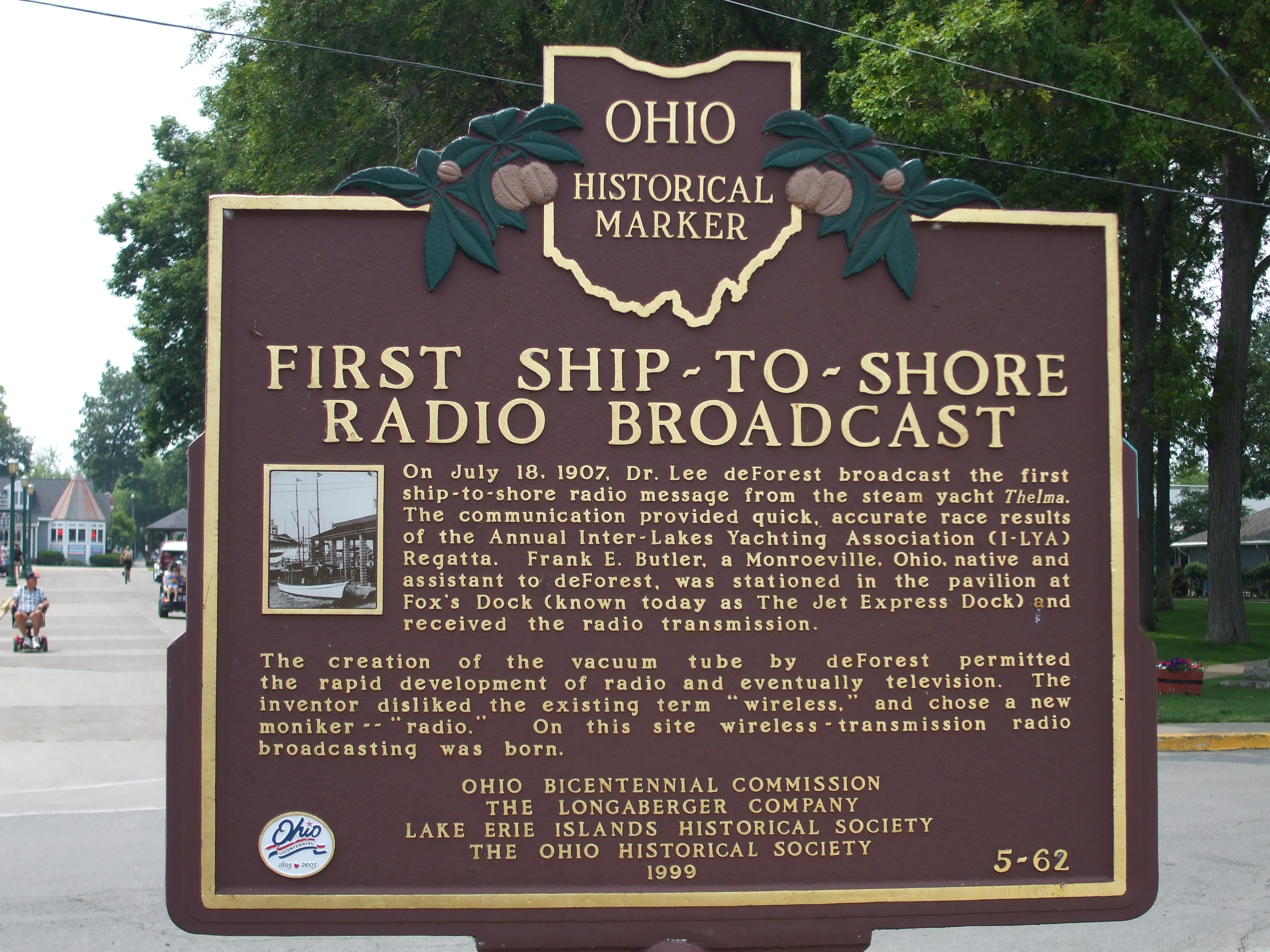
Ohio Historical Marker: On July 18, 1907, Lee de Forest transmitted the first ship-to-shore messages that were sent by radiotelephone.

At the 1904 Louisiana Purchase Exposition, Valdemar Poulsen had presented a paper on an arc transmitter, which unlike the discontinuous pulses produced by spark transmitters, created steady "continuous wave" signals that could be used for amplitude modulated (AM) audio transmissions. Although Poulsen had patented his invention, de Forest claimed to have come up with a variation that allowed him to avoid infringing on Poulsen's work. Using his "sparkless" arc transmitter, de Forest first transmitted audio across a lab room on December 31, 1906, and by February was making experimental transmissions, including music produced by Thaddeus Cahill's telharmonium, that were heard throughout the city.

On July 18, 1907, de Forest made the first ship-to-shore transmissions by radiotelephone—race reports for the Annual Inter-Lakes Yachting Association Regatta held on Lake Erie—which were sent from the steam yacht Thelma to his assistant, Frank E. Butler, located in the Fox's Dock Pavilion on South Bass Island. De Forest also interested the U.S. Navy in his radiotelephone, which placed a rush order to have 26 arc sets installed for its Great White Fleet around-the-world voyage that began in late 1907. However, at the conclusion of the circumnavigation, the sets were declared to be too unreliable to meet the Navy's needs and removed.

The company set up a network of radiotelephone stations along the Atlantic Coast and the Great Lakes, for coastal ship navigation, but the installations proved unprofitable, and by 1911, the parent company and its subsidiaries were on the brink of bankruptcy.

=== Initial broadcasting experiments ===
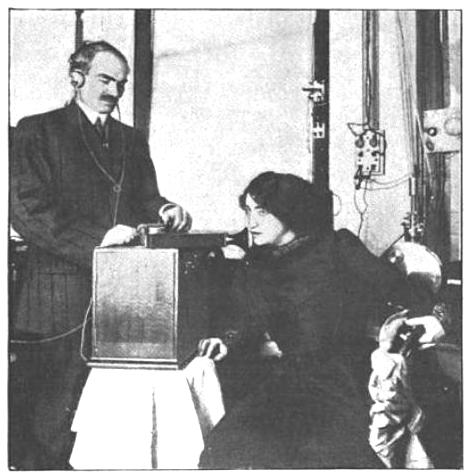
February 24, 1910 radio broadcast by Mme. Mariette Mazarin of the Manhattan Opera Company

De Forest also used the arc transmitter to conduct some of the earliest experimental entertainment radio broadcasts. Eugenia Farrar sang "I Love You Truly" in an unpublicized test from his laboratory in 1907, and in 1908, on de Forest's Paris honeymoon, musical selections were broadcast from the Eiffel Tower as a part of demonstrations of the arc transmitter. In early 1909, in what may have been the first public speech by radio, de Forest's mother-in-law, Harriot Stanton Blatch, made a broadcast supporting women's suffrage.

More ambitious demonstrations followed. A series of tests in conjunction with the Metropolitan Opera House in New York City were conducted to determine whether broadcasting opera performances live from the stage would be practical. Tosca was performed on January 12, 1910, and the next day's test included Italian tenor Enrico Caruso. On February 24, the Manhattan Opera Company's Mme. Mariette Mazarin sang "La Habanera" from Carmen and selections from the controversial Elektra over a transmitter located in de Forest's lab, but these tests showed that the idea was not yet technically feasible, and de Forest did not make any additional entertainment broadcasts until late 1916, when more capable vacuum-tube equipment became available.

=== "Grid" Audion detector ===
De Forest's most famous invention was the "grid Audion", which was the first successful three-element (triode) vacuum tube, and the first device that could amplify electrical signals. He traced its inspiration to 1900, when experimenting with a spark-gap transmitter, he briefly thought that the flickering of a nearby gas flame might be in response to electromagnetic pulses. With further tests, he soon determined that the cause of the flame fluctuations was due to air-pressure changes produced by the loud sound of the spark. Still, he was intrigued by the idea that if properly configured, using a flame or something similar to detect radio signals might be possible.

After determining that an open flame was too susceptible to ambient air currents, de Forest investigated whether ionized gases, heated and enclosed in a partially evacuated glass tube, could be used, instead. In 1905 and 1906, he developed various configurations of glass-tube devices, which he gave the general name of "Audions". The first Audions had only two electrodes, and on October 25, 1906, de Forest filed a patent for the diode vacuum tube detector, that was granted U.S. patent number 841387 on January 15, 1907. Subsequently, a third "control" electrode was added, originally as a surrounding metal cylinder or a wire coiled around the outside of the glass tube. None of these initial designs worked particularly well. De Forest gave a presentation of his work to date to the October 26, 1906, New York meeting of the American Institute of Electrical Engineers, which was reprinted in two parts in late 1907 in the Scientific American Supplement. He was insistent that a small amount of residual gas was necessary for the tubes to operate properly. However, he also admitted, "I have arrived as yet at no completely satisfactory theory as to the exact means by which the high-frequency oscillations affect so markedly the behavior of an ionized gas."

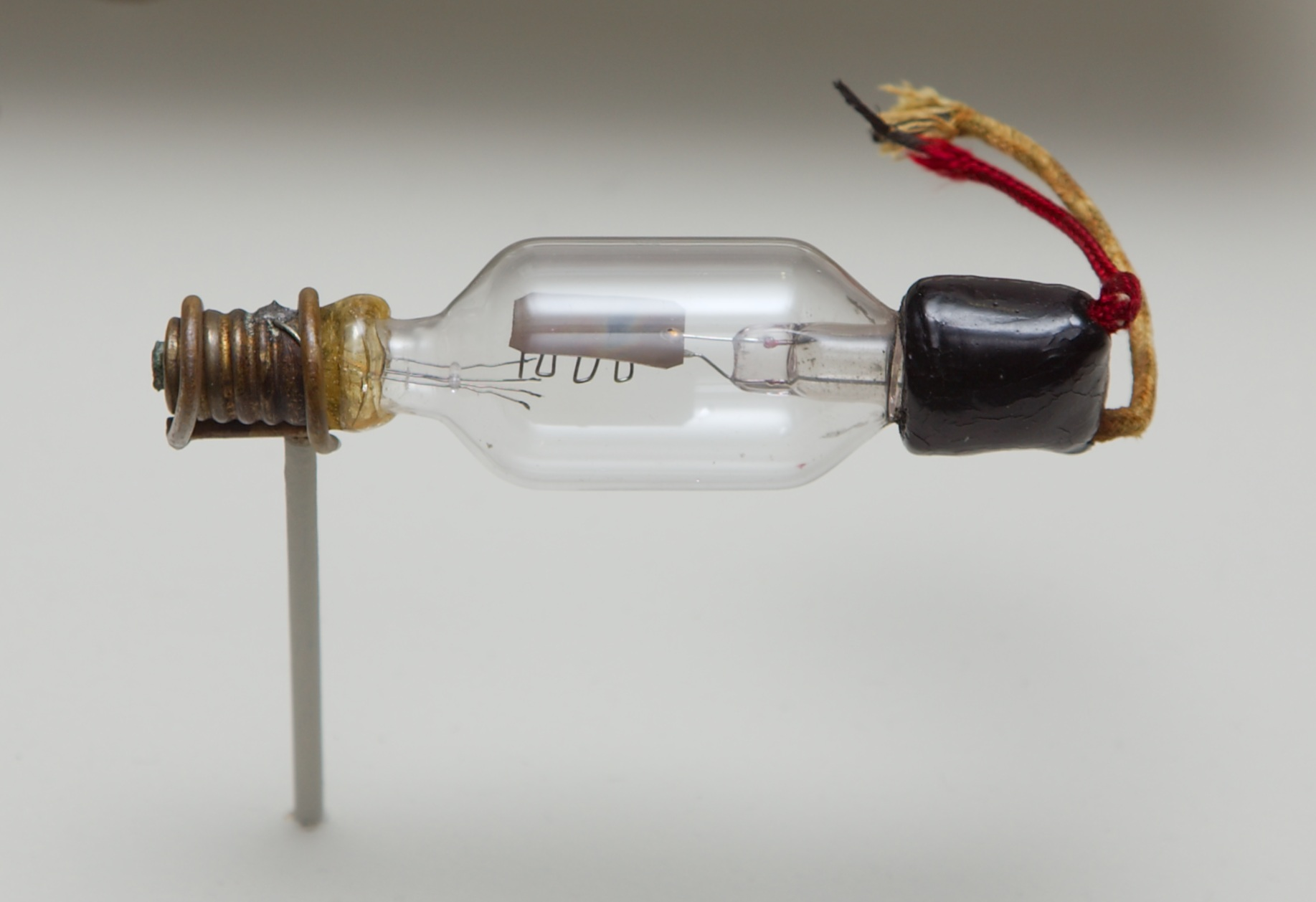
De Forest grid Audion from 1906

In late 1906, de Forest made a breakthrough when he reconfigured the control electrode, moving it from outside the tube envelope to a position inside the tube between the filament and the plate. He called the intermediate electrode a grid, reportedly due to its similarity to the "gridiron" lines on American football playing fields. Experiments conducted with his assistant, John V. L. Hogan, convinced him that he had discovered an important new radio detector. He quickly prepared a patent application, which was filed on January 29, 1907, and received U.S. patent 879,532 on February 18, 1908. Because the grid-control Audion was the only configuration to become commercially valuable, the earlier versions were forgotten, and the term Audion later became synonymous with just the grid type. It later also became known as the triode.

The grid Audion was the first device to amplify, albeit only slightly, the strength of received radio signals. However, to many observers, de Forest appeared to have done nothing more than add the grid electrode to an existing detector configuration, the Fleming valve, which also consisted of a filament and plate enclosed in an evacuated glass tube. De Forest passionately denied the similarly of the two devices, claiming his invention was a relay that amplified currents, while the Fleming valve was merely a rectifier that converted alternating current to direct current. (For this reason, de Forest objected to his Audion being referred to as "a valve".) The U.S. courts were not convinced, and ruled that the grid Audion did, in fact, infringe on the Fleming valve patent, now held by Marconi. In contrast, Marconi admitted that the addition of the third electrode was a patentable improvement, and the two sides agreed to license each other so that both could manufacture three-electrode tubes in the United States. (De Forest's European patents had lapsed because he did not have the funds needed to renew them).

Because of its limited uses and the great variability in the quality of individual units, the grid Audion was rarely used during the first half-decade after its invention. In 1908, John V. L. Hogan reported, "The Audion is capable of being developed into a really efficient detector, but in its present forms is quite unreliable and entirely too complex to be properly handled by the usual wireless operator."

== Employment at Federal Telegraph ==
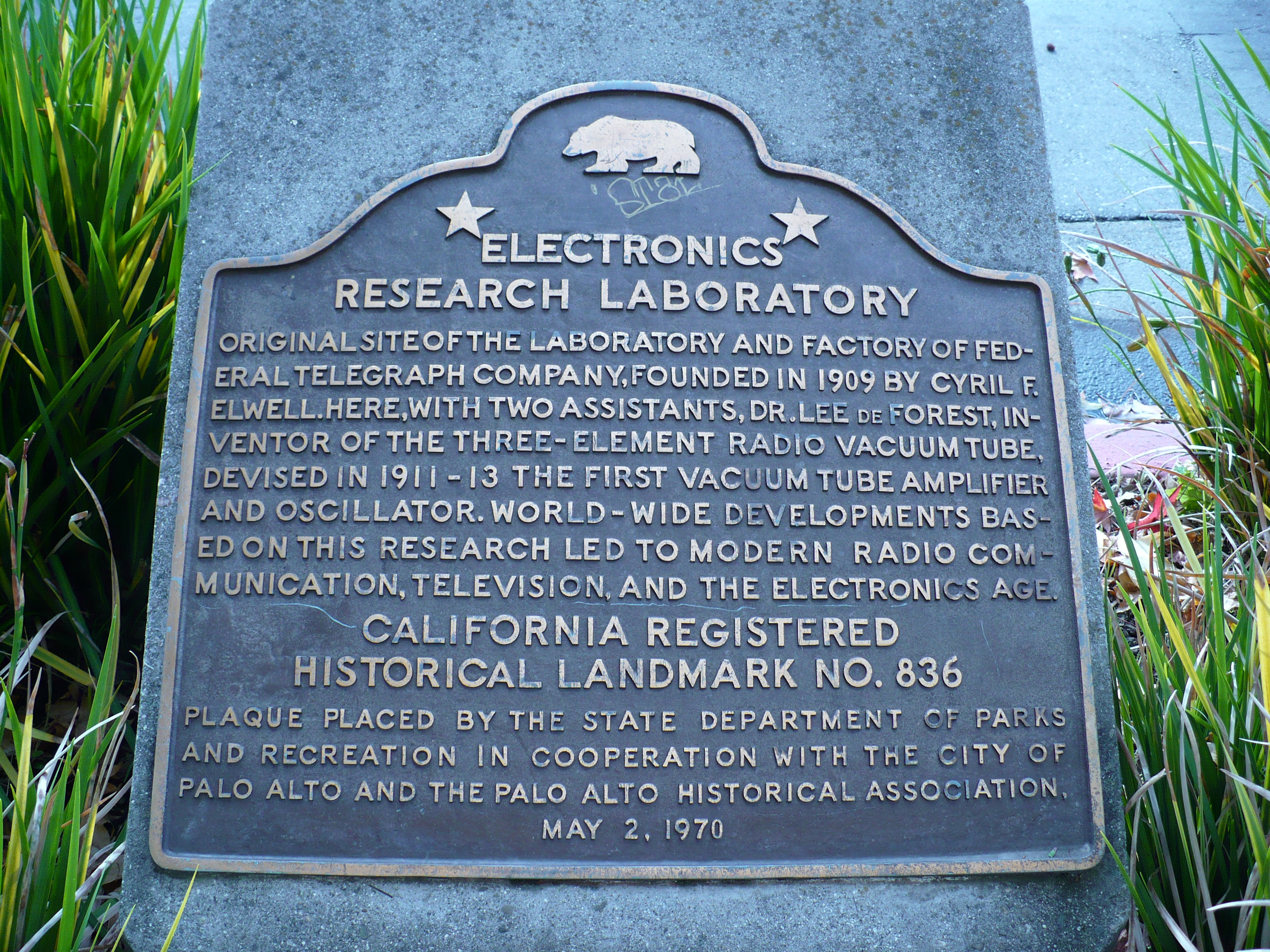
California Historical Landmark No. 836, located at the eastern corner of Channing Street and Emerson Street in Palo Alto, California, stands at the former location of the Federal Telegraph laboratory, and references Lee de Forest's development there, in 1911–1913, of "the first vacuum-tube amplifier and oscillator".

In May 1910, the Radio Telephone Company and its subsidiaries were reorganized as the North American Wireless Corporation, but financial difficulties meant that the company's activities had nearly come to a halt. De Forest moved to San Francisco, California, and in early 1911 took a research job at the Federal Telegraph Company, which produced long-range radiotelegraph systems using high-powered Poulsen arcs.

=== Audio frequency amplification ===
One of de Forest's areas of research at Federal Telegraph was improving the reception of signals, and he came up with the idea of strengthening the audio frequency output from a grid Audion by feeding it into a second tube for additional amplification. He called this a "cascade amplifier", which eventually consisted of chaining together up to three Audions.

At this time, the American Telephone and Telegraph Company was researching ways to amplify telephone signals to provide better long-distance service, and de Forest's device was recognized as having potential as a telephone line repeater. In mid-1912, an associate, John Stone Stone, contacted AT&T to arrange for de Forest to demonstrate his invention. De Forest's "gassy" version of the Audion was found to be unable to handle even the relatively low voltages used by telephone lines. (Owing to the way he constructed the tubes, de Forest's Audions would cease to operate with too high a vacuum.) However, careful research by Dr. Harold D. Arnold and his team at AT&T's Western Electric subsidiary determined that improving the tube's design would allow it to be more fully evacuated, and the high vacuum allowed it to operate at telephone-line voltages. With these changes, the Audion evolved into a modern electron-discharge vacuum tube, using electron flows rather than ions. (Dr. Irving Langmuir at the General Electric Corporation made similar findings, and both he and Arnold attempted to patent the "high vacuum" construction, but the U.S. Supreme Court ruled in 1931 that this modification could not be patented).

After a delay of 10 months, in July 1913 AT&T, through a third party who disguised his link to the telephone company, purchased the wire rights to seven Audion patents for $50,000. De Forest had hoped for a higher payment, but was again in bad financial shape and was unable to bargain for more. In 1915, AT&T used the innovation to conduct the first transcontinental telephone calls, in conjunction with the Panama-Pacific International Exposition at San Francisco.

== Reorganized Radio Telephone Company ==
Radio Telephone Company officials had engaged in some of the same stock-selling excesses that had taken place at American DeForest, and as part of the U.S. government's crackdown on stock fraud, in March 1912, de Forest and four other company officials were arrested and charged with "use of the mails to defraud". Their trials took place in late 1913, and while three of the defendants were found guilty, de Forest was acquitted. With the legal problems behind him, de Forest reorganized his company as the DeForest Radio Telephone Company and established a laboratory at 1391 Sedgewick Avenue in the Highbridge section of the Bronx in New York City. The company's limited finances were boosted by the sale, in October 1914, of the commercial Audion patent rights for radio signaling to AT&T for $90,000, with de Forest retaining the rights for sales for "amateur and experimental use". In October 1915, AT&T conducted test radio transmissions from the Navy's station in Arlington, Virginia, that were heard as far away as Paris and Hawaii.

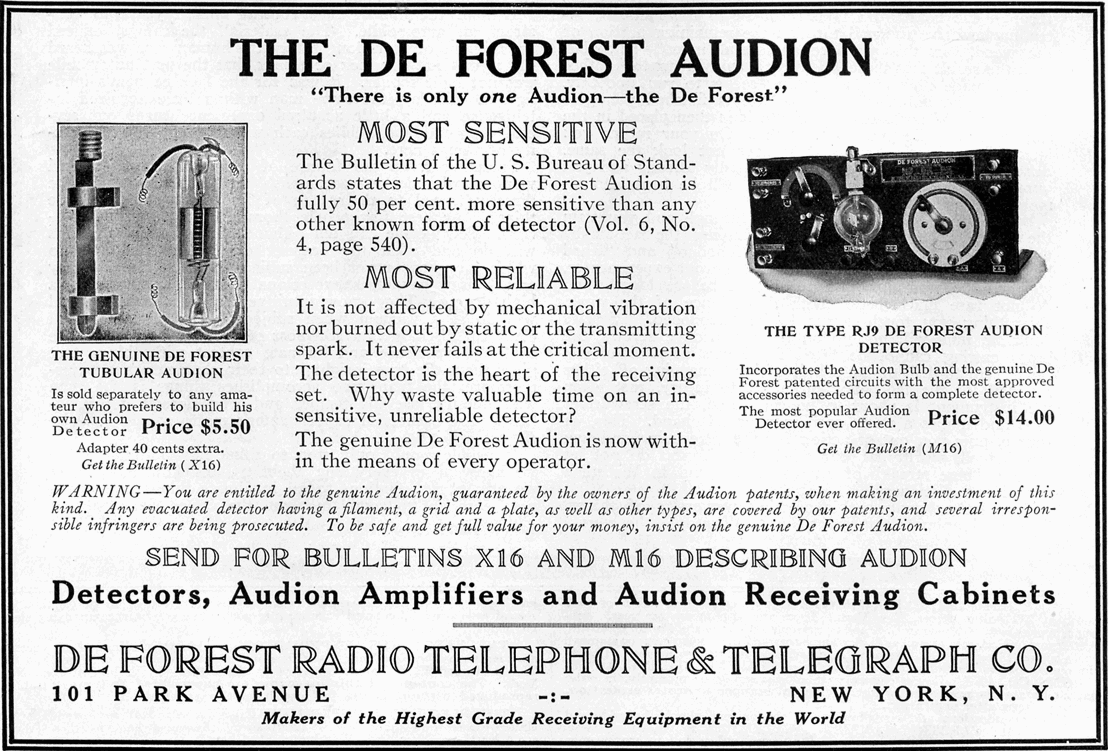
Audion advertisement, Electrical Experimenter, August 1916

The Radio Telephone Company began selling "Oscillion" power tubes to amateurs, suitable for radio transmissions. The company wanted to keep a tight hold on the tube business, and originally maintained a policy that retailers had to require their customers to return a worn-out tube before they could get a replacement. This style of business encouraged others to make and sell unlicensed vacuum tubes, which did not impose a return policy. One of the boldest was Audio Tron Sales Company founded in 1915 by Elmer T. Cunningham of San Francisco, whose Audio Tron tubes cost less, but were of equal or higher quality. The de Forest company sued Audio Tron Sales, eventually settling out of court.

In April 1917, the company's remaining commercial radio patent rights were sold to AT&T's Western Electric subsidiary for $250,000. During World War I, the Radio Telephone Company prospered from sales of radio equipment to the military, but it also became known for the poor quality of its vacuum tubes, especially compared to those produced by major industrial manufacturers such as General Electric and Western Electric.

=== Regeneration controversy ===
Beginning in 1912, investigation of vacuum-tube capabilities increased, simultaneously by numerous inventors in multiple countries, who identified additional important uses for the device. These overlapping discoveries led to complicated legal disputes over priority, perhaps the most bitter being one in the United States between de Forest and Edwin Howard Armstrong over the discovery of regeneration (also known as the "feedback circuit" and, by de Forest, as the "ultra-audion").

Beginning in 1913, Armstrong prepared papers and gave demonstrations that comprehensively documented how to employ three-element vacuum tubes in circuits that amplified signals to stronger levels than previously thought possible, and that could also generate high-power oscillations usable for radio transmission. In late 1913, Armstrong applied for patents covering the regenerative circuit, and on October 6, 1914 U.S. patent 1,113,149 was issued for his discovery.

U.S. patent law included a provision for challenging grants if another inventor could prove prior discovery. With an eye to increasing the value of the patent portfolio that would be sold to Western Electric in 1917, beginning in 1915, de Forest filed a series of patent applications that largely copied Armstrong's claims, in the hopes of having the priority of the competing applications upheld by an interference hearing at the patent office. Based on a notebook entry recorded at the time, de Forest asserted that while working on the cascade amplifier, he had stumbled on August 6, 1912, across the feedback principle, which was then used in the spring of 1913 to operate a low-powered transmitter for heterodyne reception of Federal Telegraph arc transmissions. However, strong evidence also showed that de Forest was unaware of the full significance of this discovery, as shown by his lack of follow-up and continuing misunderstanding of the physics involved. In particular, he apparently was unaware of the potential for further development until he became familiar with Armstrong's research. De Forest was not alone in the interference determination—the patent office identified four competing claimants for its hearings, consisting of Armstrong, de Forest, General Electric's Langmuir, and a German, Alexander Meissner, whose application was seized by the Office of Alien Property Custodian during World War I.

The subsequent legal proceedings become divided between two groups of court cases. The first court action began in January 1920, when Armstrong, with Westinghouse, which purchased his patent, sued the De Forest Company in district court for infringement of patent 1,113,149. On May 17, 1921, the court ruled that the lack of awareness and understanding on de Forest's part, in addition to the fact that he had made no immediate advances beyond his initial observation, made implausible his attempt to prevail as inventor.

However, a second series of court cases, which were the result of the patent office interference proceeding, had a different outcome. The interference board had also sided with Armstrong, and de Forest appealed its decision to the District of Columbia district court. On May 8, 1924, that court concluded that the evidence, beginning with the 1912 notebook entry, was sufficient to establish de Forest's priority. Now on the defensive, Armstrong's side tried to overturn the decision, but these efforts, which twice went before the U.S. Supreme Court, in 1928 and 1934, were unsuccessful.

This judicial ruling meant that Lee de Forest was now legally recognized in the United States as the inventor of regeneration. However, much of the engineering community continued to consider Armstrong to be the actual developer, with de Forest viewed as someone who skillfully used the patent system to get credit for an invention to which he had barely contributed. Following the 1934 Supreme Court decision, Armstrong attempted to return his Institute of Radio Engineers (present-day Institute of Electrical and Electronics Engineers) Medal of Honor, which had been awarded to him in 1917 "in recognition of his work and publications dealing with the action of the oscillating and nonoscillating audion", but the organization's board refused to let him, stating that it "strongly affirms the original award". The practical effect of de Forest's victory was that his company was free to sell products that used regeneration, for during the controversy, which became more a personal feud than a business dispute, Armstrong tried to block the company from even being licensed to sell equipment under his patent.

De Forest regularly responded to articles that he thought exaggerated Armstrong's contributions with animosity that continued even after Armstrong's 1954 suicide. Following the publication of Carl Dreher's "E. H. Armstrong, the Hero as Inventor" in the August 1956 Harper's magazine, de Forest wrote the author, describing Armstrong as "exceedingly arrogant, brow beating, even brutal", and defending the Supreme Court decision in his favor.

=== Oscillator transmitter suit ===
De Forest's patents were eventually inherited by the Radio Corporation of America (RCA), which aggressively used the legal system against companies it considered to be infringing on its holdings. In 1938, Arthur A. Collins mounted a successful defense against an RCA claim that Collins Radio transmitters infringed on a de Forest patent, by showing that the vacuum tubes it was using were based on an earlier patent issued to Robert Goddard.

=== Renewed broadcasting activities ===
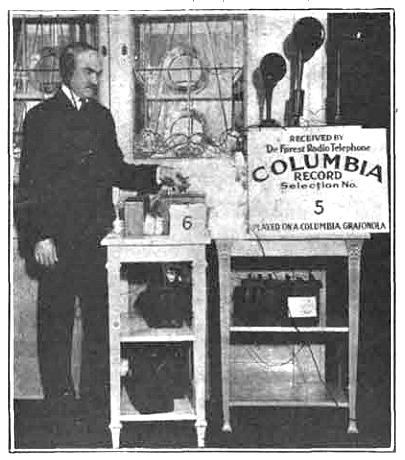
De Forest broadcasting Columbia phonograph records (October 1916)

In the summer of 1915, the company received an experimental license for station 2XG, located at its Highbridge laboratory. In late 1916, de Forest renewed the entertainment broadcasts he had suspended in 1910, now using the superior capabilities of vacuum-tube equipment. 2XG's debut program aired on October 26, 1916, as part of an arrangement with the Columbia Graphophone Company to promote its recordings, which included "announcing the title and 'Columbia Gramophone [sic] Company' with each playing". Beginning November 1, the "Highbridge Station" offered a nightly schedule featuring the Columbia recordings.

These broadcasts were also used to advertise "the products of the DeForest Radio Co., mostly the radio parts, with all the zeal of our catalogue and price list", until comments by Western Electric engineers caused de Forest enough embarrassment to make him decide to eliminate the direct advertising. The station also made the first audio broadcast of election reports—in earlier elections, stations that broadcast results had used Morse code—providing news of the November 1916 Wilson-Hughes presidential election. The New York American installed a private wire and bulletins were sent out every hour. About 2,000 listeners heard The Star-Spangled Banner and other anthems, songs, and hymns.

With the entry of the United States into World War I on April 6, 1917, all civilian radio stations were ordered to shut down, so 2XG was silenced for the duration of the war. The ban on civilian stations was lifted on October 1, 1919, and 2XG soon renewed operation, with the Brunswick-Balke-Collender company now supplying the phonograph records. In early 1920, de Forest moved the station's transmitter from the Bronx to Manhattan, but did not have permission to do so, so district Radio Inspector Arthur Batcheller ordered the station off the air. De Forest's response was to return to San Francisco in March, taking 2XG's transmitter with him. A new station, 6XC, was established as "The California Theater station", which de Forest later stated was the "first radio-telephone station devoted solely" to broadcasting to the public.

Later that year, a de Forest associate, Clarence "C.S." Thompson, established Radio News & Music, Inc., to lease de Forest radio transmitters to newspapers interested in setting up their own broadcasting stations. In August 1920, the Detroit News began operation of the Detroit News Radiophone, initially with the callsign 8MK, which later became broadcasting station WWJ.

== Phonofilm sound-on-film process ==
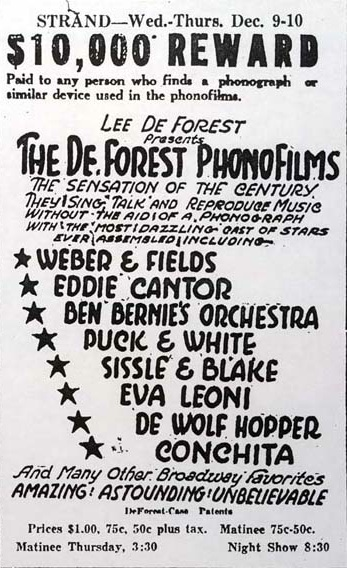
Poster promoting a Phonofilm demonstration (December 1925)

In 1921, de Forest ended most of his radio research to concentrate on developing an optical sound-on-film process called Phonofilm. In 1919, he filed the first patent for the new system, which improved upon earlier work by Finnish inventor Eric Tigerstedt and the German partnership Tri-Ergon. Phonofilm recorded the electrical waveforms produced by a microphone photographically onto film, using parallel lines of variable shades of gray, an approach known as "variable density", in contrast to "variable area" systems used by processes such as RCA Photophone. When the movie film was projected, the recorded information was converted back into sound, in synchronization with the picture.

From October 1921 to September 1922, de Forest lived in Berlin, Germany, meeting the Tri-Ergon developers (German inventors Josef Engl (1893–1942), Hans Vogt (1890–1979), and Joseph Massolle (1889–1957)) and investigating other European sound film systems. In April 1922, he announced that he would soon have a workable sound-on-film system. On March 12, 1923, he demonstrated Phonofilm to the press; this was followed on April 12, 1923, by a private demonstration to electrical engineers at the Engineering Society Building's auditorium at 33 West 39th Street in New York City.

In November 1922, de Forest established the De Forest Phonofilm Company, located at 314 East 48th Street in New York City, but none of the Hollywood movie studios expressed interest in his invention, and since these studios then controlled all the major theater chains, de Forest was limited to showing his experimental films in independent theaters (the Phonofilm Company would file for bankruptcy in September 1926.).

After recording stage performances (such as in vaudeville), speeches, and musical acts, on April 15, 1923, de Forest premiered 18 Phonofilm short films at the independent Rivoli Theater in New York City. Starting in May 1924, Max and Dave Fleischer used the Phonofilm process for their Song Car-Tune series of cartoons—featuring the "Follow the Bouncing Ball" gimmick. However, de Forest's choice of primarily filming short vaudeville acts, instead of full-length features, limited the appeal of Phonofilm to Hollywood studios.

De Forest also worked with Freeman Harrison Owens and Theodore Case, using their work to perfect the Phonofilm system, but de Forest had a falling out with both men. Due to de Forest's continuing misuse of Theodore Case's inventions and failure to publicly acknowledge Case's contributions, the Case Research Laboratory proceeded to build its own camera. That camera was used by Case and his colleague Earl Sponable to record Calvin Coolidge on August 11, 1924, which was one of the films shown by de Forest and claimed by him to be the product of his inventions.

Believing that de Forest was more concerned with his own fame and recognition than he was with actually creating a workable system of sound film, and because of his continuing attempts to downplay the contributions of the Case Research Laboratory in the creation of Phonofilm, Case severed his ties with de Forest in the fall of 1925. Case successfully negotiated an agreement to use his patents with studio head William Fox, owner of Fox Film Corporation, who marketed the innovation as Fox Movietone. Warner Bros. introduced a competing method for sound film, the Vitaphone sound-on-disc process developed by Western Electric, with the August 6, 1926, release of the John Barrymore film Don Juan.

In 1927 and 1928, Hollywood expanded its use of sound-on-film systems, including Fox Movietone and RCA Photophone. Meanwhile, theater chain owner Isadore Schlesinger purchased the UK rights to Phonofilm and released short films of British music hall performers from September 1926 to May 1929. Almost 200 Phonofilm shorts were made, and many are preserved in the collections of the Library of Congress and the British Film Institute.

== Later years and death ==
In April 1923, the De Forest Radio Telephone & Telegraph Company, which manufactured de Forest's Audions for commercial use, was sold to a group headed by Edward Jewett of Jewett-Paige Motors, which expanded the company's factory to cope with rising demand for radios. The sale also bought the services of de Forest, who was focusing his attention on newer innovations. De Forest's finances were badly hurt by the stock market crash of 1929, and research in mechanical television proved unprofitable. In 1934, he established a small shop to produce diathermy machines, and, in a 1942 interview, still hoped "to make at least one more great invention".

De Forest was a vocal critic of many of the developments in the entertainment side of the radio industry. In 1940, he sent an open letter to the National Association of Broadcasters in which he demanded: "What have you done with my child, the radio broadcast? You have debased this child, dressed him in rags of ragtime, tatters of jive and boogie-woogie." That same year, de Forest and early TV engineer Ulises Armand Sanabria presented the concept of a primitive unmanned combat air vehicle using a television camera and a jam-resistant radio control in a Popular Mechanics issue. In 1950 his autobiography, Father of Radio, was published, although it sold poorly.

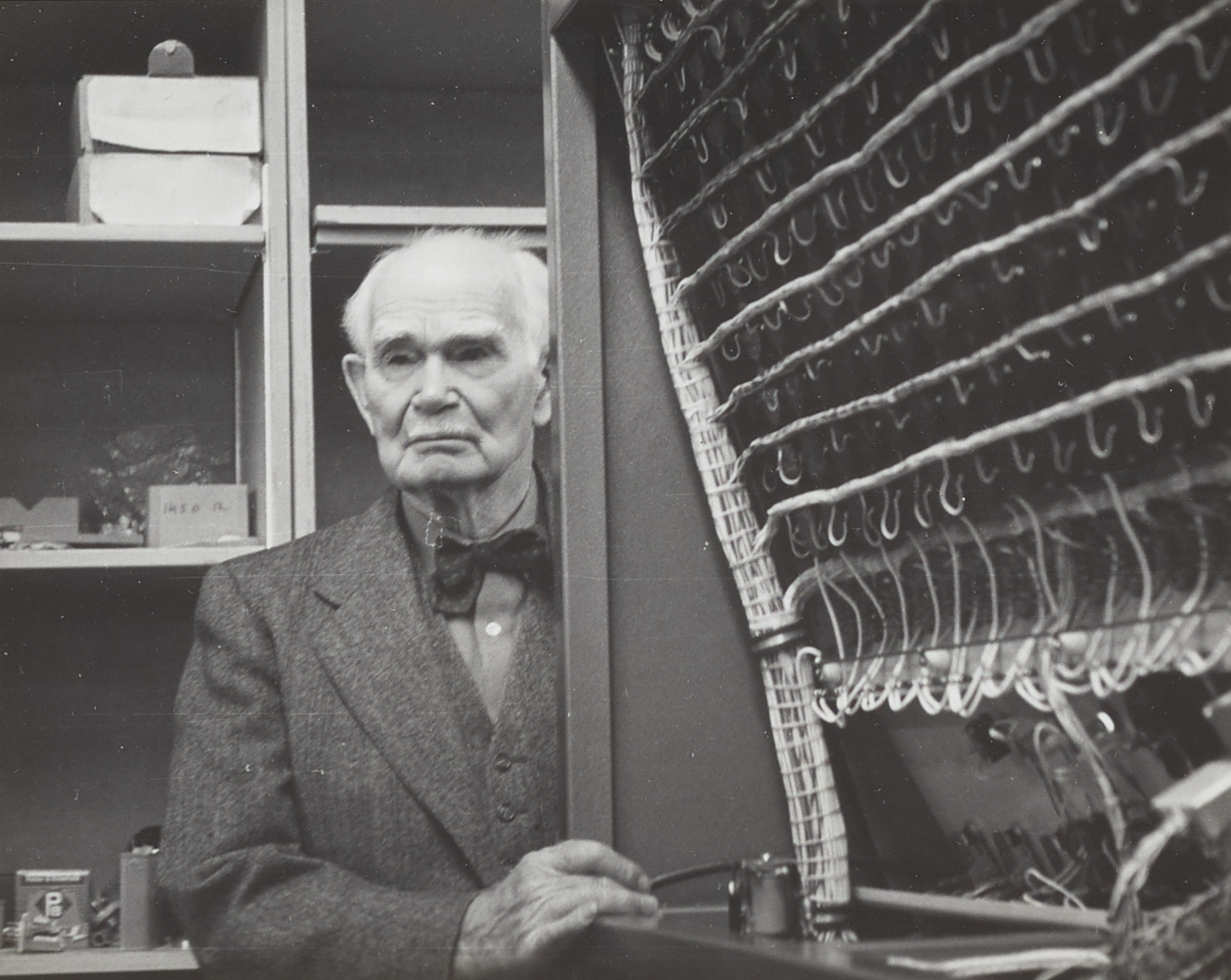
De Forest visiting Beckman Industries in Germany, 1955

De Forest was the guest celebrity on the May 22, 1957, episode of the television show This Is Your Life, where he was introduced as "the father of radio and the grandfather of television". He suffered a severe heart attack in 1958, after which he remained mostly bedridden. He died in Hollywood on June 30, 1961, aged 87, and was interred in San Fernando Mission Cemetery in Los Angeles, California. De Forest died relatively poor, with just $1,250 in his bank account.

== Legacy ==
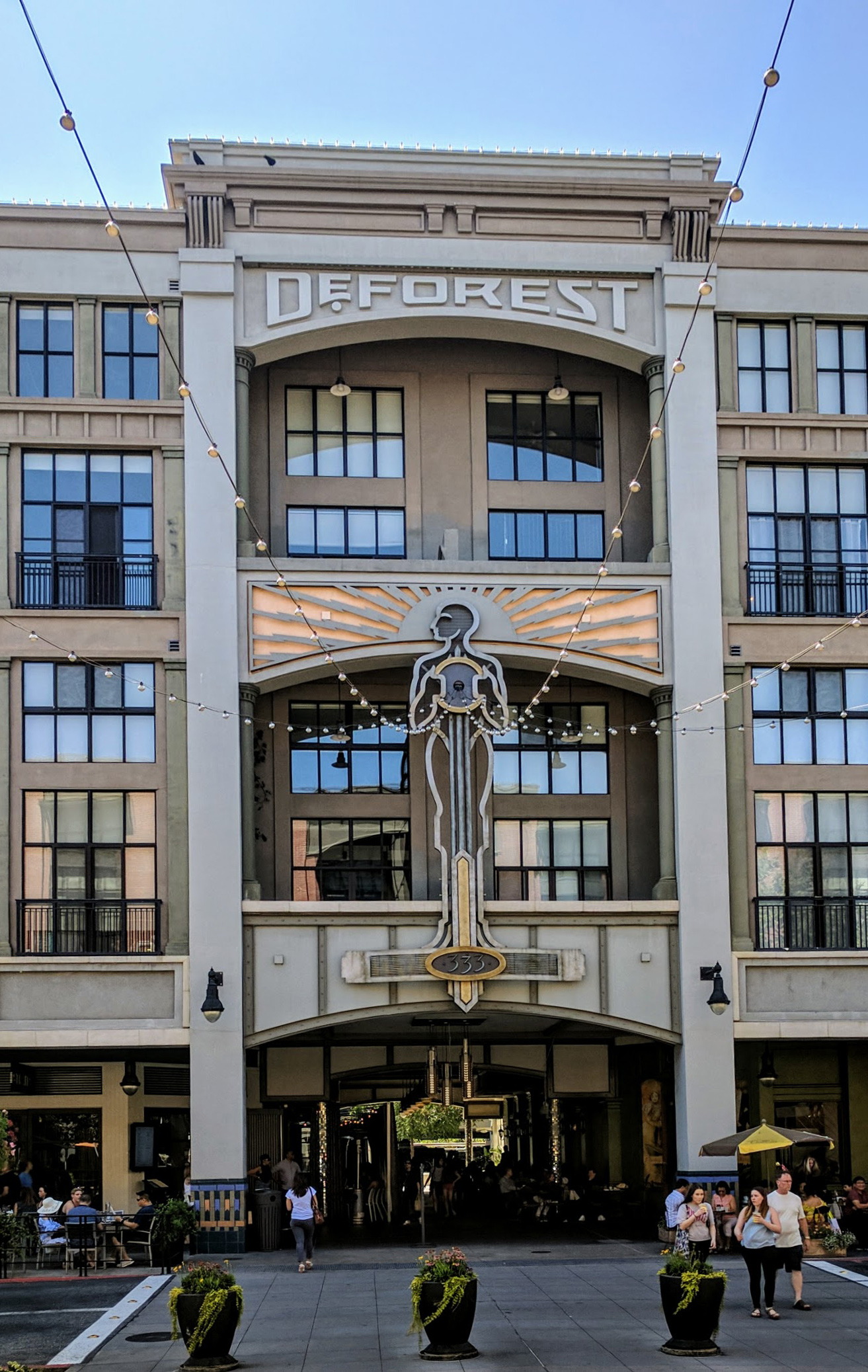
The DeForest Lofts at Santana Row, San Jose, California, are in this building named for Lee de Forest.

The grid Audion, which de Forest called "my greatest invention", and the vacuum tubes developed from it, dominated the field of electronics for 40 years, making possible long-distance telephone service, radio broadcasting, television, and many other applications. It could also be used as an electronic switching element and was later used in early digital electronics, including the first electronic computers, although the 1948 invention of the transistor led to microchips that eventually supplanted vacuum-tube technology. For this reason, de Forest has been called one of the founders of the "electronic age".

According to Donald Beaver, his intense desire to overcome the deficiencies of his childhood account for his independence, self-reliance, and inventiveness. He displayed a strong desire to achieve, to conquer hardship, and to devote himself to a career of invention. "He possessed the qualities of the traditional tinkerer-inventor: visionary faith, self-confidence, perseverance, the capacity for sustained hard work."

De Forest's archives were donated by his widow to the Perham Electronic Foundation, which in 1973 opened the Foothills Electronics Museum at Foothill College in Los Altos Hills, California. In 1991, the college closed the museum, breaking its contract. The foundation won a lawsuit and was awarded $775,000. The holdings were placed in storage for 12 years before being acquired in 2003 by History San José and put on display as the Perham Collection of Early Electronics.

== Awards and recognition ==
- Charter member, in 1912, of the Institute of Radio Engineers (IRE)
- Received the 1922 IRE Medal of Honor in "recognition for his invention of the three-electrode amplifier and his other contributions to radio"
- Awarded the 1923 Franklin Institute Elliott Cresson Medal for "inventions embodied in the Audion"
- Received the 1946 American Institute of Electrical Engineers Edison Medal "for the profound technical and social consequences of the grid-controlled vacuum tube which he had introduced"
- Honorary Academy Award (Oscar) presented by the Academy of Motion Picture Arts and Sciences in 1960, in recognition of "his pioneering inventions which brought sound to the motion picture"
- Honored February 8, 1960, with a star on the Hollywood Walk of Fame
- DeVry University was originally named the De Forest Training School by its founder Dr. Herman A. De Vry, who was a friend and colleague of de Forest's.
- De Forest crater on the far side of the Moon was named after him in 1970.

== Personal life ==
=== Marriages ===
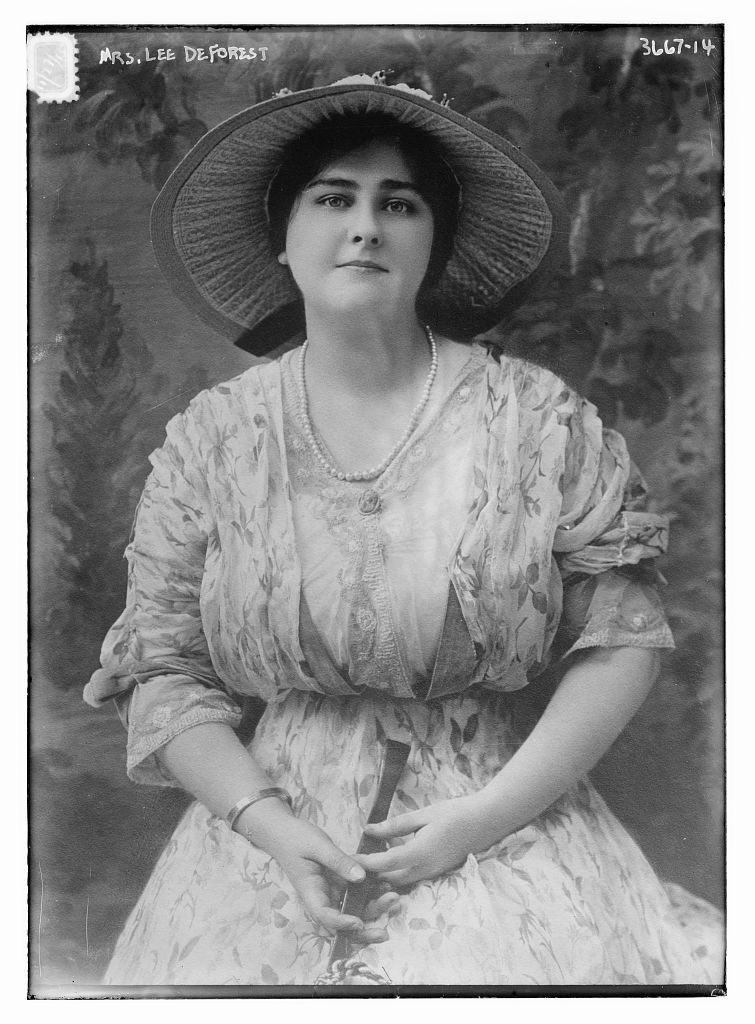
Mary Mayo, his third wife

De Forest was married four times, with the first three marriages ending in divorce:

- Lucille Sheardown and he married in February 1906, but divorced before the end of the year.
- Nora Stanton Blatch Barney (1883–1971) and he on February 14, 1908; they had a daughter, Harriet, but were separated by 1909 and divorced in 1912.
- Mary Mayo White (1891–1957), stage name Mary Mayo, and he were married in December 1912. According to census records in 1920, they were living with their infant daughter, Deena (born c. 1919); they divorced on October 5, 1930 (per Los Angeles Times). Mayo died December 30, 1957, in a fire in Los Angeles.
- Marie Mosquini (1899–1983) and he married on October 10, 1930; Mosquini was a silent-film actress, and they remained married until his death in 1961.

=== Politics ===
De Forest was a conservative Republican and fervent anticommunist and antifascist. In 1932, in the midst of the Great Depression, he voted for Franklin Roosevelt, but later came to resent him, calling Roosevelt America's "first Fascist president". In 1949, he "sent letters to all members of Congress urging them to vote against socialized medicine, federally subsidized housing, and an excess profits tax". In 1952, he wrote to the newly elected Vice President Richard Nixon, urging him to "prosecute with renewed vigor your valiant fight to put out Communism from every branch of our government". In December 1953, he canceled his subscription to The Nation, accusing it of being "lousy with Treason, crawling with Communism."

=== Religious views ===
Although raised in a strongly religious Protestant household, de Forest later became an agnostic. In his autobiography, he wrote that in the summer of 1894, an important shift in his beliefs occurred: "Through that Freshman vacation at Yale, I became more of a philosopher than I have ever since. And thus, one by one, were my childhood's firm religious beliefs altered or reluctantly discarded."

== Quotes ==
De Forest was given to expansive predictions, many of which were not borne out, but he also made many correct predictions, including microwave communication and cooking.

- "I discovered an Invisible Empire of the Air, intangible, yet solid as granite."
- "I foresee great refinements in the field of short-pulse microwave signaling, whereby several simultaneous programs may occupy the same channel, in sequence, with incredibly swift electronic communication. [...] Short waves will be generally used in the kitchen for roasting and baking, almost instantaneously." – 1952
- "So I repeat that while theoretically and technically television may be feasible, yet commercially and financially, I consider it an impossibility; a development of which we need not waste little time in dreaming." – 1926
- "To place a man in a multi-stage rocket and project him into the controlling gravitational field of the moon where the passengers can make scientific observations, perhaps land alive, and then return to earth—all that constitutes a wild dream worthy of Jules Verne. I am bold enough to say that such a man-made voyage will never occur regardless of all future advances." – 1957
- "I do not foresee 'spaceships' to the moon or Mars. Mortals must live and die on Earth or within its atmosphere!" – 1952
- "As a growing competitor to the tube amplifier comes now the Bell Laboratories’ transistor, a three-electrode germanium crystal of amazing amplification power, of wheat-grain size and low cost. Yet its frequency limitations, a few hundred kilocycles, and its strict power limitations will never permit its general replacement of the Audion amplifier." – 1952
- "I came, I saw, I invented—it's that simple—no need to sit and think—it's all in your imagination."

== Patents ==
Patent images in TIFF format

- U.S. patent 748,597 "Wireless Signaling Device" (directional antenna), filed December 1902, issued January 1904;
- U.S. patent 824,637 "Oscillation Responsive Device" (vacuum tube detector diode), filed January 1906, issued June 1906;
- U.S. patent 827,523 "Wireless Telegraph System" (separate transmitting and receiving antennas), filed December 1905, issued July 1906;
- U.S. patent 827,524 "Wireless Telegraph System," filed January 1906 issued July 1906;
- U.S. patent 836,070 "Oscillation Responsive Device" (vacuum tube detector – no grid), filed May 1906, issued November 1906;
- U.S. patent 841,386 "Wireless Telegraphy" (tunable vacuum tube detector – no grid), filed August 1906, issued January 1907;
- U.S. patent 841,387 "Device for Amplifying Feeble Electrical Currents" (...), filed August 1906, issued January 1907;
- U.S. patent 876,165 "Wireless Telegraph Transmitting System" (antenna coupler), filed May 1904, issued January 1908;
- U.S. patent 879,532 "Space Telegraphy" (increased sensitivity detector – clearly shows grid), filed January 1907, issued February 18, 1908;
- U.S. patent 926,933 "Wireless Telegraphy";
- U.S. patent 926,934 "Wireless Telegraph Tuning Device";
- U.S. patent 926,935 "Wireless Telegraph Transmitter," filed February 1906, issued July 1909;
- U.S. patent 926,936 "Space Telegraphy";
- U.S. patent 926,937 "Space Telephony";
- U.S. patent 979,275 "Oscillation Responsive Device" (parallel plates in Bunsen flame) filed February 1905, issued December 1910;
- U.S. patent 1,025,908 "Transmission of Music by Electromagnetic Waves";
- U.S. patent 1,101,533 "Wireless Telegraphy" (directional antenna/direction finder), filed June 1906, issued June 1914;
- U.S. patent 1,214,283 "Wireless Telegraphy."

== See also ==
- Metropolitan Opera radio broadcasts
- Robert von Lieben
