= 4GR =

4GR may refer to:

- 4th Gorkha Rifles
- Triple M Darling Downs, an Australian radio station formerly branded as 4GR
