= Radio 2XG =

Experimental radio station in New York City

Coordinates: 40.8422°N 73.9273°W

Radio station 2XG, also known as the "Highbridge Station", was an experimental radio station located in New York City and licensed to the De Forest Radio Telephone and Telegraph Company from 1915 to 1917 and 1920 to 1924. In 1916, it became the first radio station employing a vacuum-tube transmitter to make news and entertainment broadcasts on a regular schedule, (Note: From 1912 to 1917, Charles Herrold made regular radio broadcasts, but operated an arc-transmitter. He switched to a vacuum-tube transmitter when he resumed broadcasting activities in 1921.) and, on November 7, 1916, became the first to broadcast U.S. presidential election returns by spoken word instead of by Morse code.

== Pre-World War I history ==
Initially all radio stations used spark transmitters, which could only transmit Morse code messages. In 1904, Valdemar Poulsen invented an "arc-transmitter" capable of transmitting full audio, and in late 1906 Lee de Forest founded the Radio Telephone Company and began producing his own "sparkless" arc-transmitters. Between 1907 and 1910, de Forest made a number of demonstration entertainment broadcasts, and even spoke about developing news and entertainment broadcasting stations, but did not establish a regular service at this time.

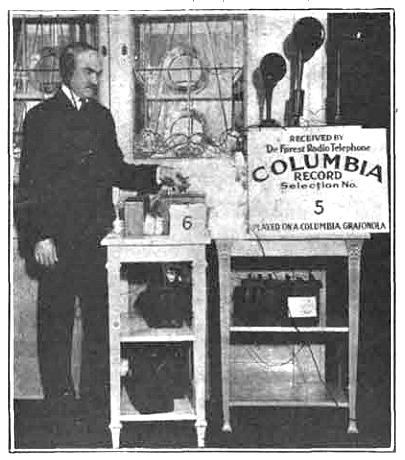
Lee de Forest broadcasting Columbia phonograph records (1916)

In 1914, de Forest established a laboratory at 1391 Sedgwick Avenue in the Highbridge section of the Bronx in New York City. Vacuum-tube transmitters had recently been developed and were found to be superior to arc-transmitters for audio transmissions. The company now concentrated on developing vacuum-tube equipment, including "Oscillion" transmitter tubes. In the summer of 1915, the company received a license for an experimental station located at the Highbridge laboratory, with the callsign 2XG.

De Forest suspended arc-transmitter broadcasting demonstrations after 1910, but later began to showcase the capabilities of the new vacuum-tube transmitters, by introducing a "wireless newspaper" making regular broadcasts of concerts and news bulletins. There were no formal government regulations restricting broadcasting at this time, so the company was free to transmit these programs over 2XG. Arrangements were made with the Columbia Graphophone record company to broadcast phonograph records from their offices at 102 West 38th Street in New York City—the phonograph company supplied records in exchange for the station "announcing the title and 'Columbia Gramophone Company' with each playing". The debut program was aired on October 26, 1916, and it was announced that nightly transmissions of news interspersed with Columbia recordings would be sent from the Highbridge laboratory beginning November 1.

2XG's original audience was mostly amateur radio operators. An early report stated that 2XG was broadcasting on "a wave length of approximately 800 meters" (375 kilohertz). Carl Dreher would later recall: "The quality was quite good, and I used to listen to the station for hours at a time". De Forest initially used these broadcasts to advertise "the products of the De Forest Radio Co., mostly the radio parts, with all the zeal of our catalogue and price list", until comments by Western Electric engineers caused him to eliminate the sales messages.

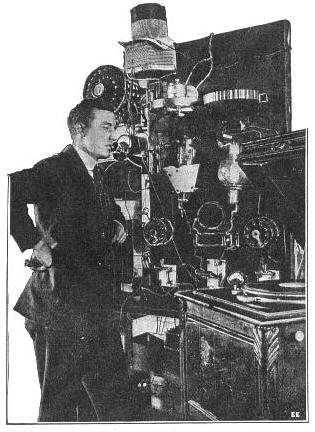
Charles Logwood broadcasting at 2XG in 1916

=== 1916 election night broadcast ===
Some of the programming was oriented toward a more general audience. On the night of the November 7, 1916 Wilson-Hughes presidential election, 2XG, in conjunction with the New York American, broadcast election returns that for the first time were transmitted in full audio instead of Morse code. This program featured telephoned bulletins supplied by the newspaper—which hailed the effort as "the first time the wireless telephone has been demonstrated as a practical, serviceable carrier of election news and comment"—and read over the air by "unassuming chap" Walter Schare. Also featured were Columbia recordings that included "'The Star Spangled Banner,' 'Columbia, the Gem of the Ocean,' 'Dixie,' 'America' and other airs long loved by Americans". Just before shutting down at 11:00 PM, the station incorrectly announced that Republican presidential candidate Charles Evans Hughes had won; however, the next day it was learned that late totals from California had tilted the election in Democratic candidate Woodrow Wilson's favor. It was estimated that 7,000 persons received the broadcast.

The concerts continued, with listeners reported as far away as Cape Hatteras, North Carolina. A "radio dance" held in Morristown, New Jersey, at the end of the year received widespread publicity. However, with the entry of the United States into World War I on April 6, 1917, all civilian radio stations were ordered shut down, and 2XG was silenced for the duration of the conflict.

== Post-World War I reactivation ==
Effective October 1, 1919, the ban on civilian radio stations was ended, and the De Forest "Highbridge Station" soon renewed operation, once more with an experimental license and the callsign 2XG. For this revival Bob Gowen and Bill Garity worked as announcers, with Richard Klein acting as program director. Phonograph records were now supplied by the Brunswick-Balke-Collender company, again in exchange for promotional announcements. There were also live performances, including multiple appearances by Vaughn De Leath—for these broadcasts she earned the sobriquet "The Original Radio Girl".

In early 1920, the 2XG transmitter was moved from the Bronx to Manhattan to take advantage of an offer by Emil J. Simon to use an antenna located atop the World's Tower building. This also brought the station's studio closer to artists in the theatrical district. However, the move had not been approved by government regulators, and the second district Radio Inspector, Arthur Batcheller, ordered the station to suspend operations. De Forest responded by moving to San Francisco in March, taking the 2XG transmitter with him, where he established a new station, 6XC, which operated as "The California Theater station", and developed an even more extensive program schedule. However, shortly thereafter, de Forest ceased involvement with radio work altogether, in order to concentrate on developing the Phonofilm sound-on-film system.

The De Forest company eventually returned to the New York City airwaves on a more limited basis. In December 1920, Vaughn De Leath made a return engagement of weekly concerts, and the next month there was a report that the De Forest laboratories were broadcasting a nightly concert between 7:30 and 8:30. However, audio transmission and broadcasting experimentation by the company was now primarily conducted through experimental station 2XX, located at the home of De Forest's Chief Engineer, Robert Gowen, in Ossining, New York.

On October 13, 1921, the De Forest company was issued a broadcasting station authorization in the form of a Limited Commercial license with the randomly assigned call letters WJX, operating on 360 meters (833 kilohertz) at its Sedgwick Avenue facility. This was the first broadcasting license issued for a station in New York City proper; however, despite its heritage, there was minimal, if any, programming ever broadcast by WJX. Effective December 1, 1921, the 360-meter wavelength was designated as the common "entertainment" broadcasting wavelength, and stations within a region had to devise timesharing agreements to allocate the hours during which they could operate. A mid-1922 agreement covering the New York City area did not even list WJX as being active. WJX continued to be included in the official government lists of stations holding licenses through early 1924, but contemporary newspapers and magazines providing station programming information do not contain any evidence that the station was actually on the air. In June 1924, WJX (along with 2XG) was officially deleted by the government.

== See also ==
- List of initial AM-band station grants in the United States
