= Triple M Darling Downs =

Coordinates: 27.5624°S 151.9610°E

4GR is an Australian commercial radio station located in Toowoomba, Queensland, currently broadcasting as Triple M on 864 AM.

The station was the first commercial radio station to broadcast in Queensland.

4GR was the brainchild of Edward Gold who had conducted test radio broadcasts in a shed from his experimental radio station 4EG prior to obtaining Queensland's first commercial radio licence to establish 4GR, which began broadcasting on 17 August 1925.

Transmitter power is 2 KW.

In 2015, 4GR celebrated its 90th birthday. In 2025 4GR celebrated 100 years Despite the station identifying itself as its original callsign 4GR for more than 90 years, the on-air branding was changed to Triple M in December 2016 as part of Southern Cross Austereo's branding overhaul of its regional radio networks.

4GR's name change came under fire from some quarters. An online reader's poll run by The Chronicle newspaper in Toowoomba found that 74% of respondents were unhappy with 4GR taking on the Triple M brand.
