= Telharmonium =

Type of electrical organ

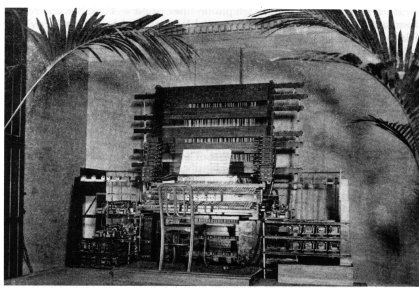
Telharmonium console by Thaddeus Cahill, 1897

The Telharmonium (also known as the Dynamophone) was an early electrical organ, developed by Thaddeus Cahill c. 1896 and patented in 1897. The electrical signal from the Telharmonium was transmitted over wires; it was heard on the receiving end by means of "horn" speakers.

Like the later Hammond organ, the Telharmonium used tonewheels to generate musical sounds as electrical signals by additive synthesis. It is considered to be the first electromechanical musical instrument.

== Timeline ==
- 1809, Prussian Samuel Thomas Soemmerring created an electrical telegraph that triggered an array of tuned bells
- In 1885, Hermann Helmholtz’s ‘On the Sensations of Tone’ (1862) appeared in English
- Elisha Gray’s ‘Musical Telegraph’ of 1874
- In Paris, Clément Ader created the ‘Théâtrophone’ in 1881 using two lines to pass music from a local theater to two separate phone receivers, dubbed "binauriclar auduition", the first "stereo" concert via telephone.
- In 1890 AT&T ceased work on a service to provide music, admitting difficulty with sound quality.
- In 1893 Hungarian Tivadar Puskás created the ‘Telefonhírmondó’ or ‘Telephone Herald’

== History ==
In the 1890s, Thaddeus Cahill was a lawyer living in Washington DC who invented devices for pianos and typewriters. He was working as a Congressional aide when he conceived the idea of the telharmonium, which would broadcast music over telephone wires for "the continuous entertainment of all present".

Although some experimentation with electronically produced sound had been carried out previously, Cahill's insight was not to turn electric signals into sound via an instrument, but to let the signals themselves be the produced sound. Earlier systems used a variety of mechanical systems attached to electrical motors or actuators to produce sound within the instrument. Cahill's concept did not do this, it sent the resulting electrical signals directly into telephone lines. At the receiver end, a metal cone attached to the telephone handset produced a primitive loudspeaker that turned the signals into an audible sound.

To produce different notes, a series of twelve separate alternating-current generators were used to produce different frequency outputs. Each generator produced a particular note, and eight separate taps off the output shifted the frequency to different octaves. The system also included controls that allowed the signals to be mixed together, producing effects like vibrato. As the first six harmonics on an equal temperament scale are also correct notes, this allowed for mixing to produce different timbres. Volume was controlled by a movable core within the generators that changed the inductance. The performer played it using a keyboard very similar to contemporary pipe organs, with the stops being used to control various effects. The final version was patented in 1897.

Cahill built three versions of the system, all differing from the original primarily in being cut-down due to the high cost of the generators. By 1901, Cahill had constructed a working model, using it as a prototype to seek financial backing for a finished machine. This version had only eight of the planned twelve generators, playing only the white keys of the piano scale. The Mark I weighed 7 tons.

The 1906 model, had 145 separate electric generators. The Mark II weighed almost 200 tons, was 60 feet long, had multiple keyboards and controls, and required at least two players. It required 30 railroad flatcars to move. It was at this point that the company attempted to begin a subscriber service, but when they did, Bell Telephone claimed that their equipment might be damaged, and refused to allow them to use their lines. The company was in luck however, as the recent discoveries in radio allowed them to begin considering this technology for distribution. Lee DeForest used the system from its site in Telharmonic Hall at 39th and Broadway to broadcast music "clearly audible to hearers miles away without wires".

A small number of performances were given for live audiences, in addition to the telephone transmissions. Performances in New York City were well received by the public in 1906, with Mark Twain among the appreciative audience. In these presentations, the performer sat at a console to control the instrument.

The 1911, last Telharmonium, the Mark III, weighed almost 200 tons, was 60 feet long, had multiple keyboards and controls, and required at least two players, was installed in a special performance room in New York City.

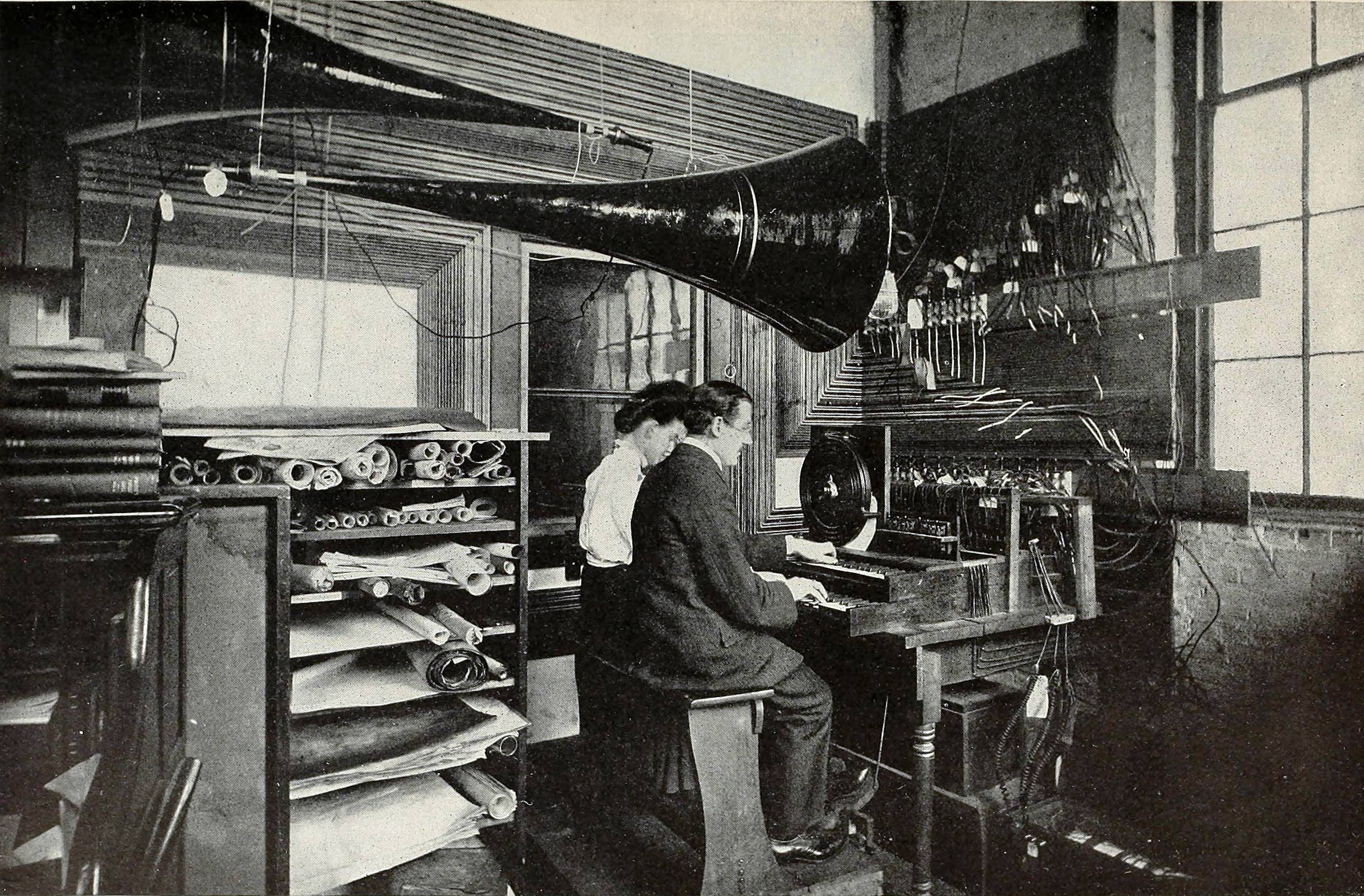
The workshop console of the telharmonium during its development at the New England Electric Music Company's Cabot Street Music Plant, in Holyoke, 1906.

The Telharmonium foreshadowed modern electronic musical equipment in a number of ways. For instance, its sound output came in the form of connecting ordinary telephone receivers to large paper cones—a primitive form of loudspeaker. Cahill stated that electromagnetic diaphragms were the most preferable means of outputting its distinctive sound. There are no known recordings of its music.

The Telharmonium was retailed by Cahill for $200,000.

The Telharmonium's demise came for a number of reasons. The instrument was immense in size and weight. This being an age before vacuum tubes had been invented, it required large electric dynamos which consumed great amounts of power in order to generate sufficiently strong audio signals. In addition, problems began to arise when telephone broadcasts of Telharmonium music were subject to crosstalk and unsuspecting telephone users would be interrupted by strange electronic music. By 1912, interest in this revolutionary instrument had changed, and Cahill's company was declared not successful in 1914.

Cahill died in 1934; his younger brother retained the Mark I for decades, but was unable to interest anyone in it. This was the last version to be scrapped, in 1962.

== Design ==
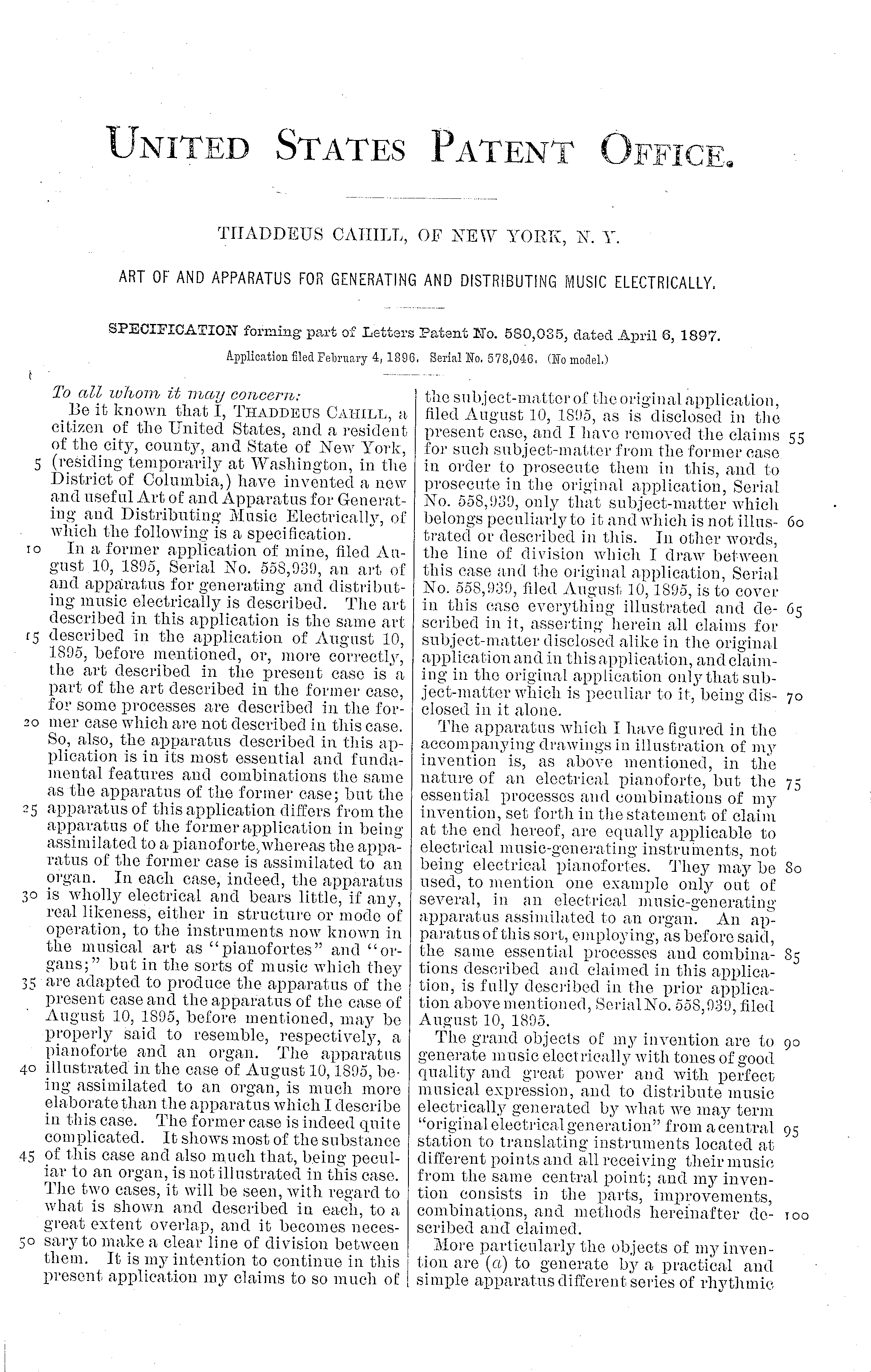
Patent 580035 was filed by Cahill for the Telharmonium in 1896

"The telharmonium generated its sounds using a system of alternators called "rheotomes." Each rheotome was actually a cog with a specific number of notched teeth. As the edge of the rheotome rotated against a wire brush (part of a larger circuit), the teeth would contact the brush a certain number of times each second, based on the rheotome's diameter. This resulted in the electrical oscillation of a sonic frequency."

Telharmonium tones were described as "clear and pure" — referring to the electronic sine wave tones it was capable of producing. However, it was not restricted to such simple sounds. Each tonewheel of the instrument corresponded to a single note, and, to broaden its possibilities, Cahill added several extra tonewheels to add harmonics to each note. This, combined with organ-like stops and multiple keyboards (the Telharmonium was polyphonic), as well as a number of foot pedals, meant that every sound could be sculpted and reshaped — the instrument was noted for its ability to reproduce the sounds of common orchestral woodwind instruments such as the flute, bassoon, clarinet, and also the cello. The Telharmonium needed 671 kilowatts of power^{:233} and had 153 keys that allowed it to work properly.

The same system is the basis for the Hammond organ. The main difference is that the signals generated by what are now called "tone wheels" are read using a conventional pickup. This produces microwatts of output, which is then sent into an electronic amplifier and then to a speaker on the organ. The smaller size and power levels allowed Hammond to add another harmonic disk, the eighth harmonic skipping the seventh, to further improve the sound. One common use of the Hammond was to produce Muzak that was initially distributed over telephone lines.

== Legacy ==
"Ferruccio Busoni was inspired by the machine at the height of its popularity and moved to write his ‘Sketch of a New Aesthetic of Music’ (1907) which in turn became the clarion call and inspiration for the new generation of electronic composers such as Edgard Varèse and Luigi Russolo."

== See also ==
- Trautonium
