= Arthur Batcheller =

Early radio pioneer (1888–1978)

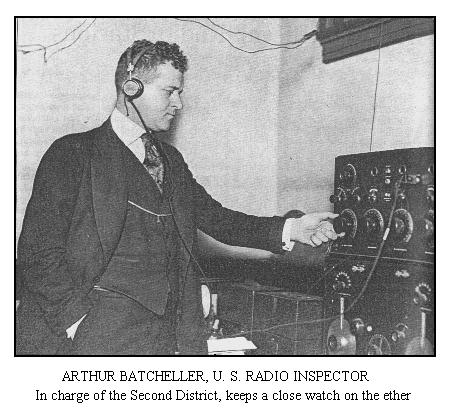
- Born: March 21, 1888; Wellesley, Massachusetts, U.S
- Died: March 7, 1978 (aged 89); Framingham, Massachusetts
- Education: Boston School of Telegraphy; Boston YMCA Electrical Engineering School; Boston YMCA Polytechnic School
- Occupation: U.S Radio Inspector
- Relatives: Mabel Batcheller, sister

Arthur Batcheller (March 21, 1888 – March 7, 1978) was a pioneer in early radio in the state of Massachusetts, one of the founders and partners of the Massachusetts Radio Telegraph School and a designated Radio Inspector for the New England district between 1917 and 1918. Batcheller was appointed Chief Radio Inspector for the Second Federal Radio District (Port of New York) in 1920 by United States President Herbert Hoover, who at the time served as Secretary of Commerce. In 1930 he was appointed to the position of Traveling Supervisor of Radio.

== Early life and education ==
Arthur Batcheller was born on March 21, 1888, in Wellesley, Massachusetts, and attended the Boston School of Telegraphy in 1902. While working at the railroad as a locomotive fireman, Batcheller pursued a degree in electronics at the Boston YMCA Electrical Engineering School. After receiving his degree, he enrolled in the Boston YMCA Polytechnic School where he earned his First Class Radio Operators license in 1913.

== Career ==
In 1906, Arthur Batcheller joined the Boston, Revere Beach and Lynn Railroad (BRB&LR) as a locomotive fireman. After his education at the Boston YMCA Electrical Engineering School, Batcheller returned to the railroad as assistant chief electrician. Arthur Batcheller left the railroad in 1914 and joined the Eastern Steamship Corporation as chief electrician until 1916. Batcheller then became assistant chief with the American Steam, Gauge and Valve Manufacturing Company from 1916 to 1917. He was appointed Radio Inspector for Boston during World War I and continued in this position until late 1918. As Radio Inspector, he was given security clearance to board German ships in Boston Harbor and seal off their transmitting equipment.

Batcheller received permission from the U.S. government to establish the First United States Government Free Radio School in 1917 to train wireless and radio operators for the military. On July 23, 1917, it opened in the Boston Custom House with 50 students. The school trained more than one thousand men from June 1917 to November 1918. When the Armistice was signed and World War I ended, however, the school closed down.

In 1919, Batcheller became a founder and partner of the Massachusetts Radio and Telegraph School. He was appointed Chief Radio Inspector for the Second Federal Radio District in New York by President Herbert Hoover in 1920, who was Secretary of Commerce at the time. In this position, Batcheller was responsible for the communication traffic of the port of New York and was commissioned to serve as the Technical Adviser to the U.S. delegation of the 1927 International Radio Telegraph Conference.

Batcheller is well known for his conflict with Lee De Forest, inventor and self-proclaimed "Father of Radio." In early 1920, De Forest moved his experimental radio station 2XG from the Bronx to Manhattan without obtaining government approval. As U.S. Radio Inspector of the Second District in New York, Batcheller shut De Forest down.

In spring of 1923, Batcheller was in charge of convening a meeting of local New York broadcasters – called the Inter-Company Radiophone Broadcasting Committee – to explain the classification of broadcasting stations, restrict the hours of experimental transmissions and encourage stations to arrange their schedules to cooperate with each other. The committee included representatives from WEAF (the parent station of modern-day WNBC), WOR, WJZ, WHN (then on-air as WEPN) and city-owned WNYC.

President Hoover assigned Batcheller to the occupation of Traveling Supervisor of Radio in 1930, the highest field position in radio service at the time. When the Federal Communications Commission was established in 1932, Batcheller became Supervisor of the Radio for the New York district.

"Batcheller also had a role in radio investigations, including several notable cases involving shipwrecks, communication treaties, and cases of radio bootlegging by federal law enforcement. During the 1930s he was responsible for developing the licensing practices of commercial networks and their member station. Through his professional assignments, Batcheller enjoyed friendships with David Sarnoff, the radio operator who received the call from the Titanic, Senator Guglielmo Marconi, and Mr. and Mrs. Charles Lindbergh."

"Arthur Batcheller was a lifetime member of Radio Engineers club where he held positions on the board of directors, committee of admission, broadcast and law committees."

== Personal life and interests ==
Arthur Batcheller's interests include photography and ballet. Batcheller was a freelance photographer in his free time and a member of the Mt. Olivet Masonic Lodge of Cambridge and the New York and London Ballet Clubs. When Batcheller was living in New York from 1920 to 1956, he and his sister Mabel attended many ballet performances. "They combined their interests in photography and dance by collecting memorabilia from signed photographs of world renowned dancers to autographed ballet slippers. Batcheller also had an interest in the movie industry and collected many photographs of actresses, including Marilyn Monroe."

In 1956 Batcheller retired and moved to Framingham, Massachusetts, where he and his sister established and managed his private museum.

== Death ==
Arthur Batcheller died on March 7, 1978, at a nursing home in Framingham, Massachusetts.

== Bibliography ==
- "Obituaries: Arthur Batcheller Radio pioneer". Boston Globe. Boston. 1978-03-09. ProQuest 747295466.
- "Collection: Arthur Batcheller papers | Archives and Special Collections". archivesspace.library.northeastern.edu.
- Radio Broadcast, Arthur Batcheller
- Jaker, Bill; Sulek, Frank; Kanze, Peter (July 2008). The Airwaves of New York: Illustrated Histories of 156 Am Stations in the Metropolitan Area, 1921–1996. McFarland. p. 7. ISBN 978-0786438723.
