= Thaddeus Cahill =

American inventor

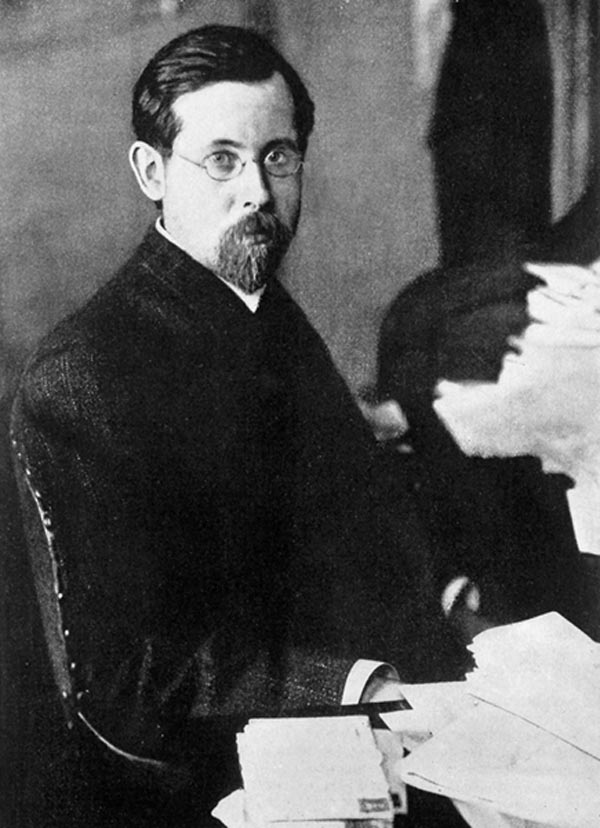
- Born: June 18, 1867; Iowa, USA
- Died: April 12, 1934 (aged 66); New York City, USA
- Occupation: Inventor

Thaddeus Cahill (June 18, 1867 – April 12, 1934) was a prominent American inventor of the early 20th century. He is widely credited with the invention of the first electromechanical musical instrument, which he dubbed the telharmonium.

He studied the physics of music at Oberlin Conservatory in Oberlin, Ohio. After working as a clerk for Congress in Washington D.C. to pay for his college studies, he graduated from the Columbian (now George Washington University) Law School in 1889. He became convinced that music could be made with electricity (and also worked on an electric typewriter). He showed his first teleharmonium to Lord Kelvin in 1902. That year he established a laboratory at Holyoke, where he was joined by his brother, Arthur T. Cahill, and where the two would first demonstrate the teleharmonium to a public audience.

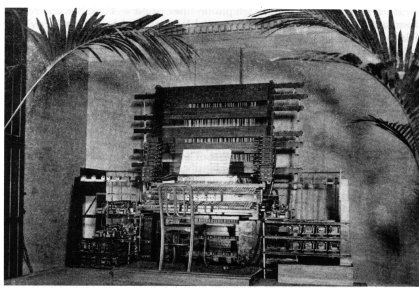
Telharmonium console, 1897.

Cahill had tremendous ambitions for his invention; he wanted telharmonium music to be broadcast into hotels, restaurants, theaters, and even houses via the telephone line. At a starting weight of 7 tons (and up to 200 tons) and a price tag of $200,000 (approx. $5,514,000 today), only three telharmoniums were ever built, and Cahill's vision was never fully implemented.

== Literature ==
- Martin, Thomas Commerford (1906). "The Telharmonium: Electricity's Alliance with Music". The American Monthly Review of Reviews. 33: 420–423.
- Reynold Weidenaar: Magic Music from the Telharmonium, The Scarecrow Press Inc.: London (1995).
