= Experimental radio station =

Radio station conducting scientific or technical experiments

Experimental station (also: experimental radio station ) is – according to article 1.98 of the International Telecommunication Union's (ITU) ITU Radio Regulations (RR) – defined as "A station utilizing radio waves in experiments with a view to the development of science or technique. This definition does not include amateur stations."

Each radio station shall be classified by the radiocommunication service in which it operates permanently or temporarily.

See also

== References / sources ==
- International Telecommunication Union (ITU)
