= Lithium-ion battery fire =

Fire caused by thermal runaway in a lithium-ion cell

A lithium-ion battery fire is a fire fed by thermal runaway inside a lithium-ion battery cell, where heat builds faster than it can escape. The cell supplies its own fuel and, in oxide cathodes, the oxygen to burn it. Water may put out the flames while reactions continue inside the casing; cells have reignited hours after a fire appeared out.

== Chemical basis ==
An internal short, a crush or overcharging starts the sequence. Around 100 °C the solid electrolyte interphase on the graphite anode breaks down, exposing lithiated carbon to the electrolyte. Polyethylene separators soften near 135 °C, polypropylene ones near 165 °C; when the film fails, the short grows. Above roughly 200 °C the cathode gives off oxygen and the carbonate solvents burn. LiPF_{6} decomposes to PF_{5}, which hydrolyses to hydrogen fluoride, one reason the smoke is toxic as well as flammable. The cell vents hydrogen, carbon monoxide, methane and hydrocarbon vapour. Tomography shows the failure front moving unevenly through the jelly roll before the next cell catches.

== Implications for legal regulations ==
Air transport changed first. UPS Airlines Flight 6 went down near Dubai in 2010 with lithium cells in the hold, and later tests found that a dense shipment could overwhelm an aircraft's cargo-compartment suppression. From 1 April 2016, standalone UN 3480 cells were barred from passenger aircraft and freighter loads capped at a 30% state of charge. The US Federal Aviation Administration relayed the limits to operators in SAFO 16004 that May. Cells were already Class 9 dangerous goods under subsection 38.3 of the UN Manual of Tests and Criteria, which subjects a design to eight abuse tests before it can be shipped. Phones and spare cells carried by passengers stayed under a lighter set of rules.

The US standard NFPA 855 sets spacing, ventilation and water-supply requirements for stationary battery energy storage systems, using UL 9540A test data to judge how far a runaway spreads. UN GTR No. 20 and China's GB 38031-2020 require a pack to survive a single-cell runaway for five minutes without fire or explosion.

== See also ==
- Thermal runaway
- Plug-in electric vehicle fire
- 2013 Boeing 787 Dreamliner grounding
- Samsung Galaxy Note 7
- Battery recycling
