= Bipolar transistor biasing =

Process necessary for BJT amplifiers to work correctly

A load line diagram, illustrating an operating point in the transistor's active region.

Biasing is the setting of the DC operating point of an electronic component. For bipolar junction transistors (BJTs), the operating point is defined as the steady-state DC collector-emitter voltage ($V_{\mathrm{ce}}$) and the collector current ($I_{\mathrm{c}}$) with no input signal applied. Bias circuits for BJTs are discussed in this article.

== Properties of bias circuits ==
In discrete circuits, bias circuits primarily consist of resistors. In integrated circuits, bias circuits are often more complicated – especially for bandgap voltage references and current mirrors. A bias circuit may also include elements such as temperature-dependent resistors, diodes, or additional voltage sources, depending on the expected range of operating conditions.

=== Modes of operation ===
In class-A amplifiers, the operating point is chosen such that the transistor stays in forward-active mode across the input signal's range. The operating point is often set near the center of the forward-active region, allowing for equal positive and negative swing in the input signal.

For digital operation (i.e. TTL), the operating point is chosen so that the transistor switches between the "on" (saturation) and "off" (cutoff) states.

=== Bias stability parameters ===
An effective bias circuit establishes an operating point that remains stable even when certain parameters vary. For BJTs, the following parameters can affect the operating point:

- Current gain ($\beta$). Varies with temperature and between different batches of the same part. Also depends on the collector-emitter voltage due to the Early effect.
- Base-emitter voltage ($V_{\mathrm{be}}$). Varies with temperature.
- Leakage current. Also varies with temperature.
- Supply voltage ($V_{\mathrm{cc}}$). Can vary for many reasons; for example, the circuit could be battery powered.

=== Thermal considerations ===
At constant current, the base-emitter voltage decreases by 2 mV (silicon) for each 1 °C rise in temperature (reference being 25 °C). By the Ebers–Moll model, if the base-emitter voltage is held constant while the temperature rises, the base current ($I_{\mathrm{b}}$) will increase, and thus the collector current will also increase. This can increase the power dissipated in the transistor, raising the temperature even further. This positive-feedback loop results in thermal runaway. There are several ways to prevent this:

- Negative feedback can be built into the bias circuit so that increased collector current leads to decreased base current (and thus decreased collector current).
- Heat sinks can prevent the temperature from rising excessively.
- The transistor can be biased such that the collector voltage ($V_{\mathrm{c}}$) is nominally less than half of the supply voltage, which implies that collector-emitter power dissipation is at its maximum value. Runaway is then impossible because increasing collector current leads to a decrease in dissipated power. This notion is known as the half-voltage principle.

== Bias circuits for class-A amplifiers ==
The following discussion treats five common bias circuits used in class-A amplifiers:

1. Fixed bias
2. Collector-to-base bias
3. Fixed bias with emitter resistor
4. Voltage divider bias or potential divider
5. Emitter bias

=== Fixed bias ===
Fixed bias circuit (Base bias)

This form of biasing is also called base bias or fixed resistance biasing.

In the given fixed bias circuit,
$$I_{\text{b}} = \frac{V_{\text{cc}} - V_{\text{be}}}{{R_{\text{b}}}} \,.$$
For a given transistor, V_{be} doesn't vary significantly during use. And since R_{b} and the DC voltage source V_{cc} are constant, the base current I_{b} also doesn't vary significantly. Thus this type of biasing is called fixed bias.

The common-emitter current gain of a transistor (specified as a range on its data sheet as h_{FE} or β), allows us to obtain $I_\text{c}$ as well:
$$I_{\text{c}} = \beta I_{\text{b}} \,.$$
Now V_{ce} can be determined:
$$V_{\text{ce}} = V_{\text{cc}} - {I_{\text{c}} R_{\text{c}}} \,.$$
Thus an operating point $( V_{\text{ce}}, \ I_{\text{c}} )$ for a transistor can be set using R_{b} and R_{c}.

Advantages:

- The operating point is set by two resistors and the calculation is very simple.

Disadvantages:

- Since the bias is set by the base current, the collector current is directly proportional to β. Therefore, the operating point will vary significantly when transistors are swapped and it is unstable under changes in temperature.
- For small-signal transistors (e.g., not power transistors) with relatively high values of β (i.e., between 100 and 200), this configuration will be prone to thermal runaway. In particular, the stability factor, which is a measure of the change in collector current with changes in reverse saturation current, is approximately β+1. To ensure absolute stability of the amplifier, a stability factor of less than 25 is preferred, and so small-signal transistors have large stability factors.

Usage:

Due to the above inherent drawbacks, fixed bias is rarely used in linear circuits (i.e., those circuits which use the transistor as a current source). Instead, it is often used in circuits where the transistor is used as a switch. However, one application of fixed bias is to achieve crude automatic gain control in the transistor by feeding the base resistor from a DC signal derived from the AC output of a later stage.

=== Collector feedback bias ===
Collector-to-base bias

This configuration employs negative feedback to prevent thermal runaway and stabilize the operating point. In this form of biasing, the base resistor $R_{\text{b}}$ is connected to the collector instead of $V_{\text{cc}}$. So any thermal runaway will induce a voltage drop across the $R_{\text{c}}$ resistor that will throttle the transistor's base current.

From Kirchhoff's voltage law, the voltage $V_{\text{R}_{\text{b}}}$ across the base resistor $R_{\text{b}}$ is

$$V_{\text{R}_{\text{b}}} = V_{\text{cc}} \, - \, \mathord{\overbrace{(I_{\text{c}} + I_{\text{b}}) R_{\text{c}}}^{\text{Voltage drop across } R_{\text{c}}}} \, - \, \mathord{\overbrace{V_{\text{be}}}^{\text{Voltage at base}}}.$$

By the Ebers–Moll model, $I_{\text{c}} = \beta I_{\text{b}}$, and so

$$V_{\text{R}_{\text{b}}} = V_{\text{cc}} - (\overbrace{\beta I_{\text{b}}}^{I_{\text{c}}} + I_{\text{b}}) R_{\text{c}} -  V_{\text{be}} = V_{\text{cc}} - I_{\text{b}} (\beta + 1) R_{\text{c}} -  V_{\text{be}}.$$

From Ohm's law, the base current $I_{\text{b}} = V_{\text{R}_{\text{b}}} / R_{\text{b}}$, and so

$$\overbrace{I_{\text{b}} R_{\text{b}}}^{V_{\text{R}_{\text{b}}}} = V_{\text{cc}} - I_{\text{b}} (\beta + 1) R_{\text{c}} -  V_{\text{be}}.$$

Hence, the base current $I_{\text{b}}$ is

$$I_{\text{b}} = \frac{ V_{\text{cc}} - V_{\text{be}} }{ R_{\text{b}} + ( \beta + 1 ) R_{\text{c}} }$$

If $V_{\text{be}}$ is held constant and temperature increases, then the collector current $I_{\text{c}}$ increases. However, a larger $I_{\text{c}}$ causes the voltage drop across resistor $R_{\text{c}}$ to increase, which in turn reduces the voltage $V_{\text{R}_{\text{b}}}$ across the base resistor $R_{\text{b}}$. A lower base-resistor voltage drop reduces the base current $I_{\text{b}}$, which results in less collector current $I_{\text{c}}$. Because an increase in collector current with temperature is opposed, the operating point is kept stable.

Advantages:

- Circuit stabilizes the operating point against variations in temperature and β (i.e. replacement of transistor).
- Circuit stabilizes the operating point (as a fraction of $V_{\text{cc}}$) against variations in $V_{\text{cc}}$.

Disadvantages:

- Although small changes in β are OK, large changes in β will greatly change the operating point. $R_{\text{b}}$ must be chosen once β is known fairly accurately (perhaps within ~ 25%), yet the variability of β between "identical" parts is often larger than this.
- In this circuit, to keep $I_{\text{c}}$ independent of $\beta$, the following condition must be met:
  $$I_{\text{c}} = \beta I_{\text{b}} = \frac { \beta (V_{\text{cc}} - V_{\text{be}})}{R_{\text{b}} + R_{\text{c}} + \beta R_{\text{c}}} \approx \frac{(V_{\text{cc}} - V_{\text{be}})}{R_{\text{c}}}$$
  which is the case when
  $$\beta R_{\text{c}} \gg R_{\text{b}}.$$
- As $\beta$-value is fixed (and generally unknown) for a given transistor, this relation can be satisfied either by keeping $R_{\text{c}}$ fairly large or making $R_{\text{b}}$ very low.
- If $R_{\text{c}}$ is large, a high $V_{\text{cc}}$ is necessary, which increases cost as well as precautions necessary while handling.
- If $R_{\text{b}}$ is low, the reverse bias of the collector–base region is small, which limits the range of collector voltage swing that leaves the transistor in active mode.
- The resistor $R_{\text{b}}$ causes an AC feedback, reducing the voltage gain of the amplifier. This undesirable effect is a trade-off for greater Q-point stability. However, a T (R-C-R) network can be used to reduce the AC feedback, which however poses a heavier load on the collector than the simple feedback resistor. At higher frequencies a R-L feedback network can be used, however, it will introduce peaking into the frequency response at various points.

Usage: In this configuration, which is known as "voltage-shunt feedback', the output voltage is sensed and the feedback signal (a current) is applied in shunt (i.e., in parallel with the input). This means that the input impedance "looking into the base" is actually reduced. This can easily be verified by application of Miller's Theorem. This situation is similar to that of an inverting op-amp circuit where the input impedance of the amplifier at the virtual earth is near zero and the overall input impedance is determined by the external series resistor. Due to the gain reduction from feedback, this biasing form is used only when the trade-off for stability is warranted. Adding an emitter resistor to this circuit will increase the input impedance

=== Fixed bias with emitter resistor ===
Fixed bias with emitter resistor

The fixed bias circuit is modified by attaching an external resistor to the emitter. This resistor introduces negative feedback that stabilizes the operating point. From Kirchhoff's voltage law, the voltage across the base resistor is
$$V_{R_{\text{b}}} = V_{\text{cc}} - I_{\text{e}} R_{\text{e}} - V_{\text{be}}$$
From Ohm's law, the base current is
$$I_{\text{b}} = \frac {V_{R_{\text{b}}}}{R_\text{b}}$$
The way feedback controls the bias point is as follows. If V_{be} is held constant and temperature increases, emitter current increases. However, a larger I_{e} increases the emitter voltage V_{e} = I_{e}R_{e}, which in turn reduces the voltage V_{Rb} across the base resistor. A lower base-resistor voltage drop reduces the base current, which results in less collector current because I_{c} = β I_{b}. Collector current and emitter current are related by I_{c} = α I_{e} with α ≈ 1, so the increase in emitter current with temperature is opposed, and the operating point is kept stable.

Similarly, if the transistor is replaced by another, there may be a change in I_{c} (corresponding to change in β-value, for example). By similar process as above, the change is negated and operating point kept stable.

For the given circuit,
$$I_{\text{b}} = \frac { V_\text{cc} - V_\text{be} } { R_\text{b} + ( \beta+1) R_\text{e} }$$
Advantages:

The circuit has the tendency to stabilize operating point against changes in temperature and β-value.

Disadvantages:

- In this circuit, to keep I_{c} independent of β the following condition must be met:
  $$I_\text{c} = \beta I_\text{b} = \frac { \beta (V_\text{cc} - V_\text{be})}{R_\text{b} + ( \beta+1) R_\text{e}} \approx \frac {(V_\text{cc} - V_\text{be})}{R_\text{e}}$$
  which is approximately the case if
  $$(\beta + 1)R_\text{e} \gg R_\text{b}.$$
- As β-value is fixed for a given transistor, this relation can be satisfied either by keeping R_{e} very large, or making R_{b} very low.
  - If R_{e} is of large value, high V_{cc} is necessary. This increases cost as well as precautions necessary while handling.
  - If R_{b} is low, a separate low voltage supply should be used in the base circuit. Using two supplies of different voltages is impractical.
- In addition to the above, R_{e} causes AC feedback which reduces the voltage gain of the amplifier.

Usage:

The feedback also increases the input impedance of the amplifier when seen from the base, which can be advantageous. Due to the above disadvantages, this type of biasing circuit is used only with careful consideration of the trade-offs involved.

Collector-Stabilized Biasing.

=== Voltage divider biasing or emitter Resistor Stabilizer bias ===
Voltage divider bias

The voltage divider is formed using external resistors R_{1} and R_{2}. The voltage across R_{2} forward biases the emitter junction. By proper selection of resistors R_{1} and R_{2}, the operating point of the transistor can be made independent of β. In this circuit, the voltage divider holds the base voltage fixed (independent of base current), provided the divider current is large compared to the base current. However, even with a fixed base voltage, collector current varies with temperature (for example) so an emitter resistor is added to stabilize the Q-point, similar to the above circuits with emitter resistor. The voltage divider configuration achieves the correct voltages by the use of resistors in certain patterns. By manipulating the resistors in certain ways you can achieve more stable current levels without having β value affect it too much.

In this circuit the base voltage, $V_{\text{b}}$, across $R_2 \$is given by
$$V_\text{b} =
V_\text{cc} \frac{R_2}{(R_1+R_2)} - I_\text{b} \frac{R_1 R_2}{(R_1+R_2)}
\approx V_\text{cc} \frac{R_2}{(R_1+R_2)}$$
provided $I_\text{b} << I_1 = V_\text{b} / R_1$.

It is also known that
$$V_\text{b} = V_\text{be} + V_\text{e} = V_\text{be} + I_\text{e} R_\text{e} .$$
For the given circuit,
$$I_\text{b} =\frac
{
\frac
{V_\text{cc}}{1+R_1/R_2}
- V_\text{be}
}
{( \beta + 1)R_\text{e} + R_1 \parallel R_2 }$$
Advantages:

- Operating point is almost independent of β variation.
- Operating point stabilized against shift in temperature.

Disadvantages:

- In this circuit, to keep I_{c} independent of β the following condition must be met:
  $$I_\text{c} = \beta I_\text{b} = \beta \frac
{
\frac
{V_\text{cc}}{1+R_1/R_2}
- V_\text{be}
}
{( \beta + 1)R_\text{e} + R_1 \parallel R_2 } \approx \frac
{ \frac {V_\text{cc}}{1+R_1/R_2}- V_\text{be}}
{R_\text{e}} ,$$
  which is approximately the case if
  $$( \beta + 1 ) R_\text{e} >> R_1 \parallel R_2$$
  where R_{1} || R_{2} denotes the equivalent resistance of R_{1} and R_{2} connected in parallel.
- As β-value is fixed for a given transistor, this relation can be satisfied either by keeping R_{e} fairly large, or making R_{1}||R_{2} very low.
  - If R_{e} is of large value, high V_{cc} is necessary. This increases cost as well as precautions necessary while handling.
  - If R_{1} || R_{2} is low, either R_{1} is low, or R_{2} is low, or both are low. A low R_{1} raises V_{b} closer to V_{c}, reducing the available swing in collector voltage, and limiting how large R_{c} can be made without driving the transistor out of active mode. A low R_{2} lowers V_{be}, reducing the allowed collector current. Lowering both resistor values draws more current from the power supply and lowers the input resistance of the amplifier as seen from the base.
- AC as well as DC feedback is caused by R_{e}, which reduces the AC voltage gain of the amplifier. A method to avoid AC feedback while retaining DC feedback is discussed below.

Usage:

The circuit's stability and merits as above make it widely used for linear circuits.

==== Voltage divider with AC bypass capacitor ====
Voltage divider with capacitor

The standard voltage divider circuit discussed above faces a drawback – AC feedback caused by resistor R_{e} reduces the gain. This can be avoided by placing a capacitor (C_{e}) in parallel with R_{e}, as shown in circuit diagram.

Advantages:

- The result is that the DC operating point is well controlled.
- The AC-gain is much higher (approaching β), rather than the much lower (but predictable) value of $R_{\text{c}}/R_{\text{e}}$ without the capacitor.

Disadvantages:

- Adds an extra component.

=== Emitter bias ===
Emitter bias

When a split supply (dual power supply) is available, this biasing circuit is the most effective. It provides zero bias voltage at the emitter or collector for load. The negative supply V_{ee} is used to forward-bias the emitter junction through R_{e}. The positive supply V_{cc} is used to reverse-bias the collector junction.

If R_{b} is small enough, base voltage will be approximately zero. Therefore, emitter current is,
$$I_\text{e} = {\frac {V_\text{ee} - V_\text{be}} {R_\text{e}}}$$
Advantages:

- The operating point is independent of $\beta$ if $R_\text{e} \gg R_\text{b} / \beta$.
- Only two resistors are necessary for the common collector configuration. (And four resistors for a common emitter or common base configuration.)

Disadvantages:

- This type can only be used when a split (dual) power supply is available.

== Class-B and AB amplifiers ==
=== Signal requirements ===
Class B and AB amplifiers employ 2 active devices to cover the complete 360 deg of input signal flow. Each transistor is therefore biased to perform over approximately 180 deg of the input signal. Class B bias is when the collector current I_{c} with no signal is just conducting (about 1% of maximum possible value). Class-AB bias is when the collector current I_{c} is about 1/4 of maximum possible value. The class-AB push–pull output amplifier circuit below could be the basis for a moderate-power audio amplifier.

A practical amplifier circuit

Q3 is a common emitter stage that provides amplification of the signal and the DC bias current through D1 and D2 to generate a bias voltage for the output devices. The output pair are arranged in class-AB push–pull, also called a complementary pair. The diodes D1 and D2 provide a small amount of constant voltage bias for the output pair, just biasing them into the conducting state so that crossover distortion is minimized. That is, the diodes push the output stage into class-AB mode (assuming that the base-emitter drop of the output transistors is reduced by heat dissipation).

This design automatically stabilizes its operating point, since overall feedback internally operates from DC up through the audio range and beyond. The use of fixed diode bias requires the diodes to be both electrically and thermally matched to the output transistors. If the output transistors conduct too much, they can easily overheat and destroy themselves, as the full current from the power supply is not limited at this stage.

A common solution to help stabilize the output device operating point is to include some emitter resistors, typically an ohm or so. Calculating the values of the circuit's resistors and capacitors is done based on the components employed and the intended use of the amplifier.

== See also ==
- Biasing
- Small-signal model
- Bipolar junction transistor
- MOSFET
