= Fire emergency =

Fire emergency most commonly refers to:

- Conflagration, a very large undesired fire
  - Structure fire, an unwanted fire within a building or other structure
  - Vehicle fire, a fire involving a motor vehicle
  - Wildfire, a fire that occurs naturally or artificially in a forest or other natural environment

== See also ==
- Firefighting
- Fire department
- Emergency
- Emergency service
