= Auto fire =

Auto fire or autofire may refer to:

- Vehicle fire
- Automatic firearm
- Auto Fire, one of the fires that occurred during the January 2025 Southern California wildfires

== See also ==
- Autonomous weapon systems
- Joystick
