= Load line =

Load line may refer to:

- Load line (watercraft), related to ship construction
- Load line (electronics), a method of determining operating points in circuits with non-linear elements.
