= Inflatable vision unit =

Aircraft safety device

Approximate deployed volume and shape of an inflatable vision unit, in gray

An inflatable vision unit (IVU, sold under the trademark Emergency Vision Assurance System or EVAS) is an aircraft safety device which is deployed in the event of heavy smoke in the cockpit, and provides a volume of clear air with clear plastic windows on either end, through which the pilot can see key flight instruments and see out the front windscreen. As of October 2019, it was the only such device approved by the Federal Aviation Administration.

The EVAS device was invented by Bertil Werjefelt, with patents issued in 1994 and 2000. Its installation cost is about US$30,000, roughly equivalent to a cockpit window pane, according to its inventor.

== Operation ==
When stowed, the EVAS measures 3 by 8.5 by 10 inches (8 by 22 by 25 cm). In the event that smoke in the cockpit obscures a pilot's vision and cannot be cleared by a smoke evacuation system, the IVU device is manually unstowed and inflated in under thirty seconds by using a pull tab, making contact with the instrument panel and windscreen. By placing their smoke goggles against the window on the other end of the unit, the pilot is afforded a clear view of their instruments and windscreen. The IVU includes a pump, 0.3-micron air filter, and battery to provide for two hours of operation in order to seek an emergency landing.

== Adoption ==
Calls by the Independent Pilots Association and other industry bodies to include the device in aircraft followed the September 2010 crash of UPS Airlines Flight 6, in which smoke in the cockpit was a major factor. The IPA represents UPS Airlines pilots. As of October 2010, the FAA had not mandated use of the device.

As of October 2019, over 7000 IVU devices had been delivered, and the device was certified by ten aircraft manufacturers for use in 120 aircraft models. Gulfstream Aerospace was the first manufacturer to incorporate the device, and as of October 2019 had equipped more than a thousand of its aircraft with the technology. The device is available as a standard option on Gulfstream, Bombardier, and Dassault Falcon jet aircraft. The manufacturer claims that the device is included on 86% of U.S. domestic cargo aircraft, and 72% of cargo aircraft worldwide.
