= Plug-in electric vehicle fire =

Type of vehicle incident

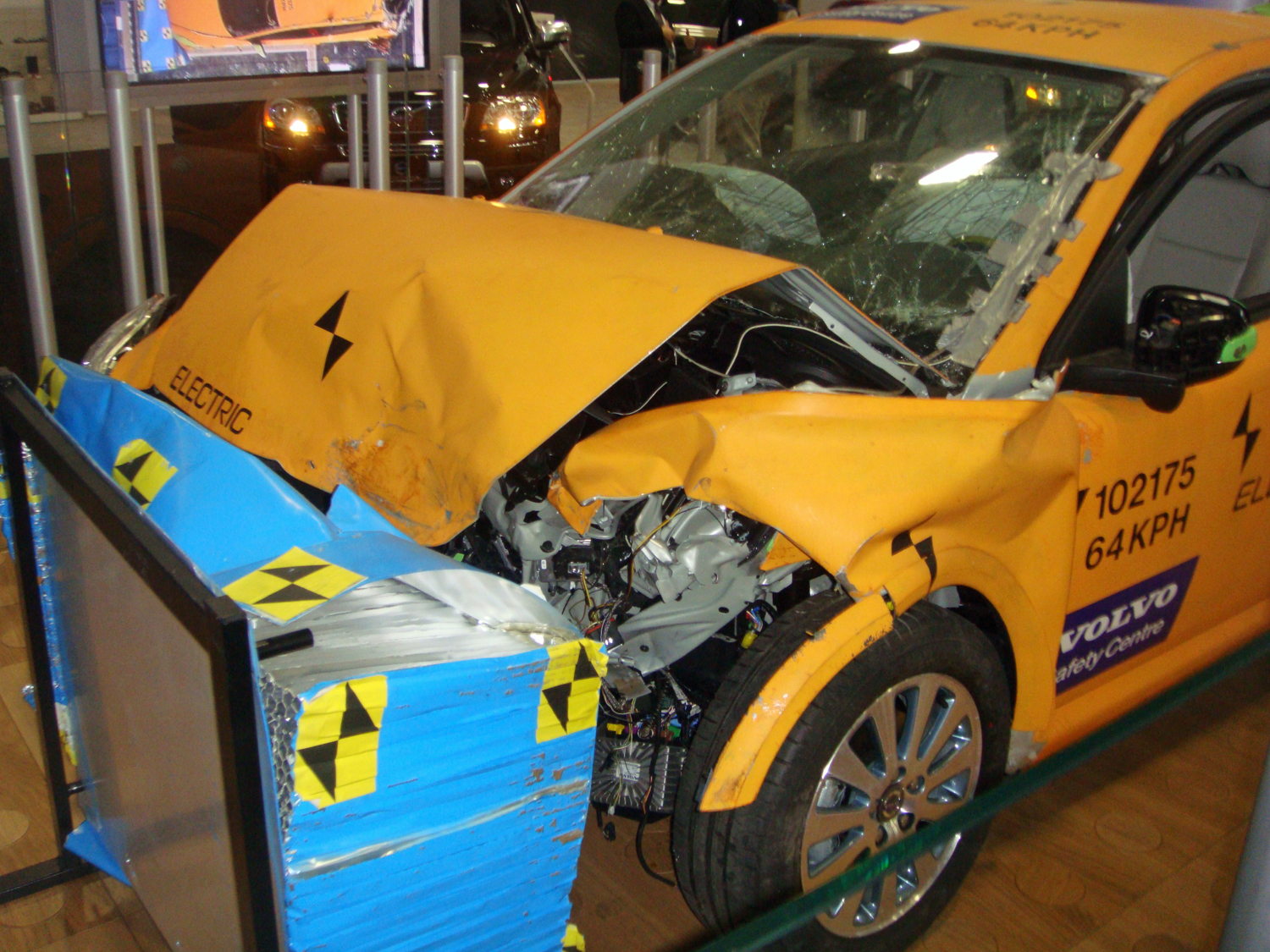
Frontal crash test of a Volvo C30 DRIVe Electric to assess the safety of the battery pack

The number of vehicle fires involving plug-in electric vehicles has increased alongside the increase in production and adoption of consumer electric vehicles (EVs). EV fires pose a specific risk because their traction batteries hold a large amount of energy, and commonly use lithium-ion battery chemistry which can sometimes be susceptible to thermal runaway, especially if the battery is manufactured poorly, or damaged. EV fires are significantly less frequent per-vehicle than fires involving cars with internal combustion engines.

== Regulatory activity ==
=== United States ===
In 2013, based on two fire incidents occurring on U.S. public highways, the National Highway Traffic Safety Administration (NHTSA) opened a preliminary evaluation to determine if undercarriage strikes presented an undue fire risk on the 2013 Tesla Model S. An estimated population of 13,108 Model S cars were part of this initial investigation. Quoting from the final report on this investigation:

... [NHTSA's Office of Defect Investigations] believes impacts with road debris are normal and foreseeable. In this case, Tesla’s revision of vehicle ride height and addition of increased underbody protection should reduce both the frequency of underbody strikes and the resultant fire risk. A defect trend has not been identified. Accordingly, the investigation is closed...

In 2017, NHTSA conducted a study "to assess potential Li-ion battery vehicle safety issues and provide NHTSA information it can use to assess needs and prioritize its future research activities on Li-ion battery vehicles":

... Li-ion battery technology shows great promise for enabling substantial improvements in energy efficiency in mobile and stationary applications at modest cost. The technology is in the early stages of development. As with other high energy density storage technologies, failure of a Li-ion battery may release substantial amounts of energy that may create safety hazards. The investigation suggests that Li-ion battery safety can be managed effectively, although substantial research and development and codes and standards development is needed. In all cases, management of Li-ion battery safety requires insight, knowledge, and modeling of behavior, stress and performance at the electrochemistry level.

In 2020, NHTSA denied a request for a defect investigation into all Tesla Model S and X cars manufactured between 2012 and 2019.

In 2021, NHTSA established a Battery Safety Initiative for Electric Vehicles "to coordinate research and other activities to address safety risks relating to batteries in electric vehicles."

In 2022, in the aftermath of Hurricane Ian, NHTSA's executive director commented on the risk of fire and reignition related to contact of a lithium-ion battery with salt water (seawater). He referenced some recent tests and studies on the subject.

As at December 2024, NHTSA planned to

... [c]ontinue to advance battery safety through NHTSA’s participation in ... Global Technical Regulation No. 20 for Electric Vehicle Safety. NHTSA ... is chairing the development of the second phase of work currently underway... The activity is considering, among other things, safety issues related to battery thermal runaway, water immersion, and vibration resistance.

=== World Forum for Harmonization of Vehicle Regulations ===
In June 2011, the passive safety group (GRSP) of the World Forum for Harmonization of Vehicle Regulations announced its intention to convene an Informal Working Group (IWG) on Electrical Vehicle Safety.

At its tenth meeting (in March 2016), this informal working group agreed on a two-step approach. Phase 1 would cover near-term critical safety requirements. Phase 2 would cover the remaining safety requirements which require longterm research as well as further improvement of global technical Regulation. Nine task forces were formed:

- Task Force 1 (China) – Protection against Water
- Task Force 2 (Organisation Internationale des Constructeurs d'Automobiles) – Low electricity energy option
- Task Force 3 (Organisation Internationale des Constructeurs d'Automobiles) – Electrolyte leakage
- Task Force 4 (Organisation Internationale des Constructeurs d'Automobiles) – Rechargeable Electrical Energy Storage Systems (REESS) in-use
- Task Force 5 (China) – Thermal propagation
- Task Force 6 (Japan) – State of Charge
- Task Force 7 (Korea) – Fire resistance
- Task Force 8 (China) – Bus and Truck
- Task Force 9 (US) – Warning system

In December 2024, the informal working group reported that

... thermal propagation continues to be the single most important issue in Phase 2 based on the field data... Chinese experts informed the meeting of the revisions to the national Thermal Propagation Test requirements and the physical robustness of the system; the European Commission’s expert reported on the progress of the Special Interest Group on Thermal Propagation (TP) in seeking an amendment of UNR. 100, and the US expert informed group of the rulemaking activities, specifically, that the US issued a Notice of Proposed Rulemaking (NPRM) in April 2024, which should be finalized by the end of 2024. The NPRM contains a proposal for a comprehensive documentation requirement for TP in all vehicle drive and park modes.

The expert from Korea gave an update on the investigation of the fire of an electric vehicle that resulted in injuries to 20 persons and damage to 900 vehicles in an underground garage in Seoul in August. As a result of this incident, Korea is considering tightening its testing requirements and certification procedures.

The group proceeded to discuss a way forward toward a successful resolution of Phase 2. The resulting table documented that there is a potential for a consensus on approaches to address thermal events and thermal propagation but all agreed that more work is needed.

The IWG plans its next in-person meeting for February 17–19 [2025] in Torrance, California, followed by a technical tour of Honda’s EV facility.

== Safety guidelines for fire hazards ==
The US Department of Energy maintains a website of Electric Vehicle Safety Training Resources for First and Second Responders.

== Thermal incidents in electric vehicles ==
Since at least 2010, fires and thermal incidents have been reported in cars, buses, boats, and other electric vehicles. Among the most prevalent models in reports of thermal events are the Hyundai Kona and various Tesla vehicles.

== Bans ==
E-bikes are banned in many buildings in New York City because of the fire hazard.

E-scooters and e-unicycles are banned from the Transport for London network.

Raja Ferry Port, a Ko Samui ferry service provider, has announced the ban of EVs use ferry services, effective on November 18, 2024. It claims that there is a risk of overheating batteries that could cause a fire. However, Seatran Ferry, another Ko Samui ferry service provider, does not fully ban EVs, but EV owners will be required to sign a disclaimer in case any incidents occur with their EVs.

== See also ==
- Boeing 787 Dreamliner battery problems (related to lithium-ion batteries accidents, on aircraft)
- Lithium-ion batteries and safety
- UPS Airlines Flight 6, an airplane crash caused by the thermal runaway of its lithium-ion battery cargo
- Vehicle fire
