= 2013 Boeing 787 Dreamliner grounding =

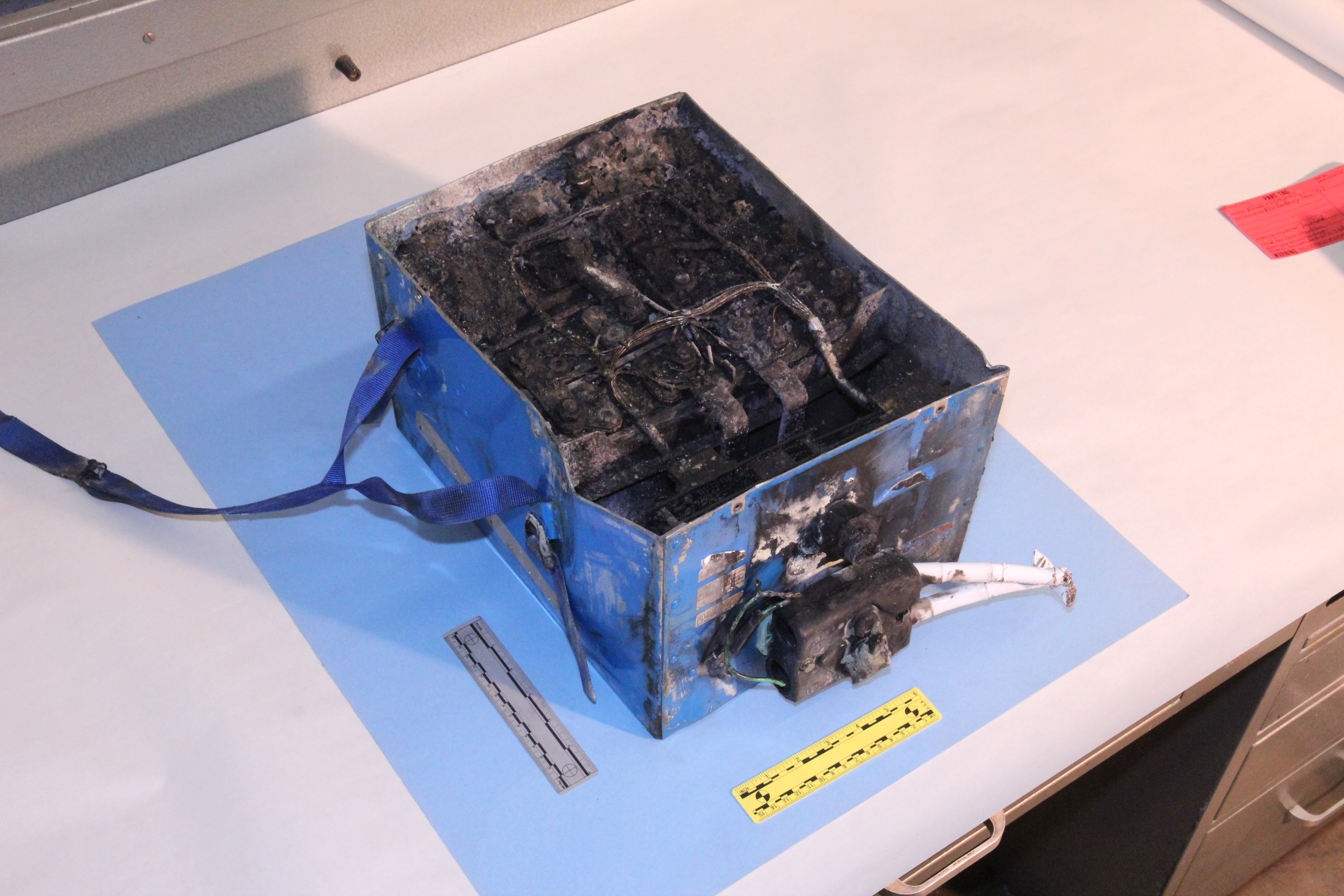
The heavily burned battery from JA829J after it suffered thermal runaway

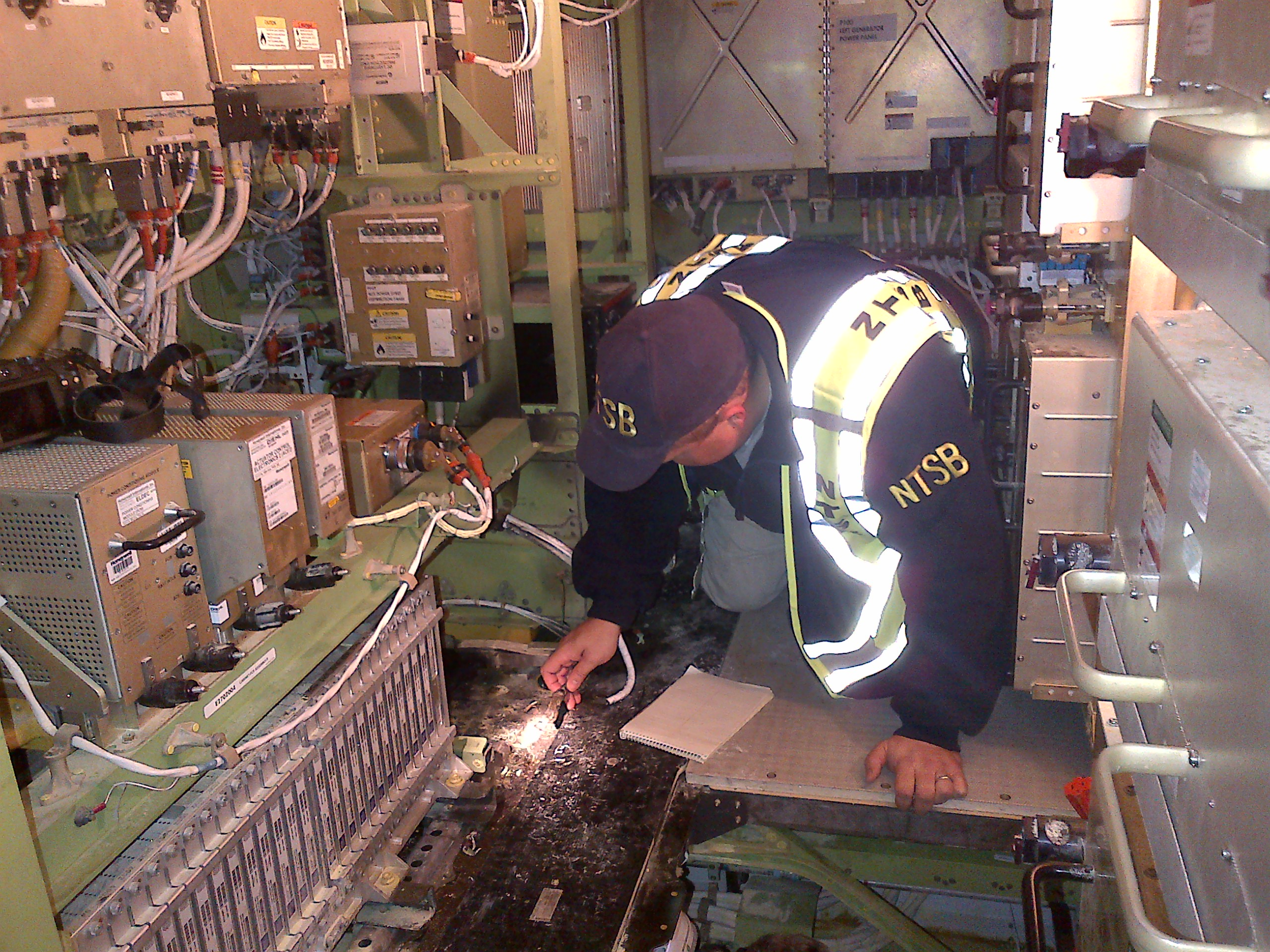
The aft electronics bay that held the battery that caught fire

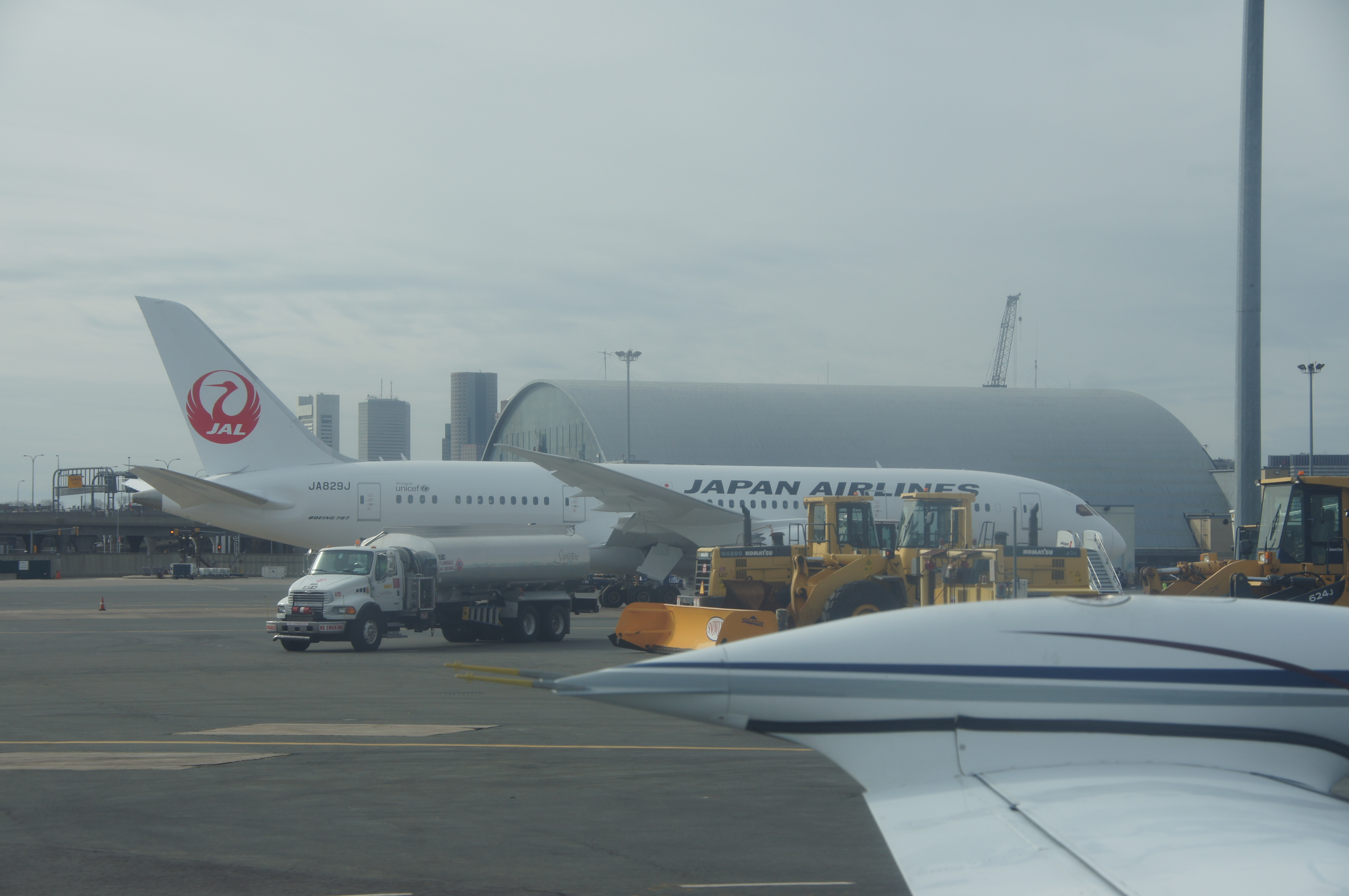
The grounded Japan Airlines 787 at Boston Logan Airport

In 2013, the second year of service for the Boeing 787 Dreamliner, a widebody jet airliner, several of the aircraft suffered from electrical system problems stemming from its lithium-ion batteries. Incidents included two electrical fires, one aboard an All Nippon Airways 787 and another on a Japan Airlines 787; the second fire was found by maintenance workers while the aircraft was parked at Boston's Logan International Airport. The United States Federal Aviation Administration (FAA) ordered a review of the design and manufacture of the Boeing 787 Dreamliner and grounded the entire Boeing 787 fleet, the first such grounding since that of the McDonnell Douglas DC-10 in 1979. The plane has had two major battery thermal runaway events in 52,000 flight hours, neither of which were contained safely; this length of time between failures was substantially less than the 10 million flight hours predicted by Boeing.

The National Transportation Safety Board (NTSB) released a report on December 1, 2014, and assigned blame to several groups:

- GS Yuasa of Japan, for battery manufacturing methods that could introduce defects not caught by inspection
- Boeing's engineers, who failed to consider and test for worst-case battery failures
- The Federal Aviation Administration, that failed to recognize the potential hazard and did not require proper tests as part of its certification process

== Timeline ==
On January 7, 2013, an Auxiliary Power Unit (APU) battery overheated and started a fire in an empty 787 operated by Japan Airlines (JAL) at Boston's Logan International Airport. On January 9, United Airlines reported a problem in one of its six 787s. The wiring was located in the same area as where the battery fire occurred on JAL's airliner; subsequently, the U.S. National Transportation Safety Board opened a safety probe.

On January 11, 2013, the FAA announced a comprehensive review of the 787's critical systems, including the aircraft's design, manufacture and assembly. U.S. Department of Transportation secretary Ray LaHood stated the administration was "looking for the root causes" behind the recent issues. The head of the FAA, Michael Huerta, said that nothing found so far "suggests [the 787] is not safe". Japan's transport ministry also launched an investigation in response.

On January 16, 2013, an All Nippon Airways (ANA) 787 made an emergency landing at Takamatsu Airport on Shikoku Island after the flight crew received a computer warning of smoke present inside one of the electrical compartments. ANA said that there was an error message in the cockpit, citing a battery malfunction. Passengers and crew were evacuated using the emergency slides. There are no fire-suppression systems in the electrical compartments holding batteries, only smoke detectors. According to the JTSB report, the main battery suffered thermal runaway during the airplane's takeoff climb. Although no fire broke out, the whole battery was damaged in the incident.

After the two battery incidents in 2013, a U.S. Senate committee prepared for a hearing to look into US aviation regulator oversight, safety, and the 2007 FAA certification of the 787. Before the proposed hearing in 2013 an FAA spokesperson defended the 2007 safety certification of the 787 by saying, "the whole aviation system is designed so that if the worst case happens, there are systems in place to prevent that from interfering with other systems on the plane."

On February 12, 2013, the Wall Street Journal reported that "Aviation safety investigators are examining whether the formation of microscopic structures known as dendrites inside the Boeing Co. 787's lithium-ion batteries played a role in twin incidents that prompted the fleet to be grounded nearly a month ago."

In June 2013, the House held a hearing on aviation safety to address the safety of the 787 and the grounding of the worldwide fleet of fifty 787s. The FAA spokesperson, Peggy Gilligan stated that despite the battery issues the approval process didn't require anymore legislation to ensure aircraft safety.

On July 12, 2013, an Ethiopian Airlines 787 battery caught fire while on the ground at London Heathrow Airport having landed 10 hours prior. This fire was different in that it was caused by lithium-manganese batteries used by the emergency locator transmitter located in the upper rear portion of the aircraft's fuselage. This led to the Air Accident Investigations Branch (AAIB) requesting for the device to "either be disconnected or removed from aircraft."

On January 14, 2014, Japan Airlines said a maintenance crew at Narita Airport discovered smoke coming from the main battery of one of its Boeing 787 jets, two hours before the plane was due to fly to Bangkok from Tokyo. Maintenance workers found smoke and unidentified liquid coming from the main battery, and alarms in the cockpit indicated faults with the power pack and its charger. The airline said no other equipment was affected by the incident. Preliminary information indicated that one cell had overheated and vented electrolyte and that the enclosure for the battery case contained the vented electrolyte. The cause was not immediately known, and the airline investigated the incident. Soon after this incident, The Guardian noted that "The [U.S. Federal Aviation Administration] also launched a review of the design, manufacture, and assembly of the 787 in January last year and said its report would be released last summer, but it has so far not released the report and has not responded to questions about when it will be finished."

On November 13, 2017, a lithium-ion battery overheated on a United Airlines Boeing 787 during approach to Charles de Gaulle Airport. A spokesman for Boeing said, "the plane experienced a fault with a single cell", adding that it was not a safety of flight issue.

== Groundings ==
On January 16, 2013, both major Japanese airlines ANA and JAL announced that they were voluntarily grounding or suspending flights for their fleets of 787s after multiple incidents involving different 787s, including emergency landings. These two carriers operated 24 of the 50 Dreamliners delivered to that date. It was estimated the grounding could cost ANA over $1.1 million a day.

On January 16, 2013, the Federal Aviation Administration (FAA) issued an emergency airworthiness directive ordering all U.S.-based airlines to ground their Boeing 787s until yet-to-be-determined modifications were made to the electrical system to reduce the risk of the battery overheating or catching fire. This was the first time that the FAA had grounded an airliner type since 1979. The FAA also announced plans to conduct an extensive review of the 787's critical systems. The review's focus was on the safety of the lithium-ion batteries that use lithium cobalt oxide (LiCoO_{2}) as the positive electrode. These electrodes are known for their thermal runaway hazard and provide oxygen for a fire. The 787 battery contract was signed in 2005, when LiCoO_{2} batteries were the only type of lithium aerospace battery available. Still, since then, newer and safer types (such as LiFePO_{4}) and LiMn_{2}O_{4} (lithium manganate), which provide less reaction energy during thermal runaway, have become available. The FAA approved a 787 battery in 2007 with nine "special conditions". A battery approved by the FAA (through Mobile Power Solutions) was made by Rose Electronics using Kokam cells, but the batteries installed in the 787 were made by Yuasa.

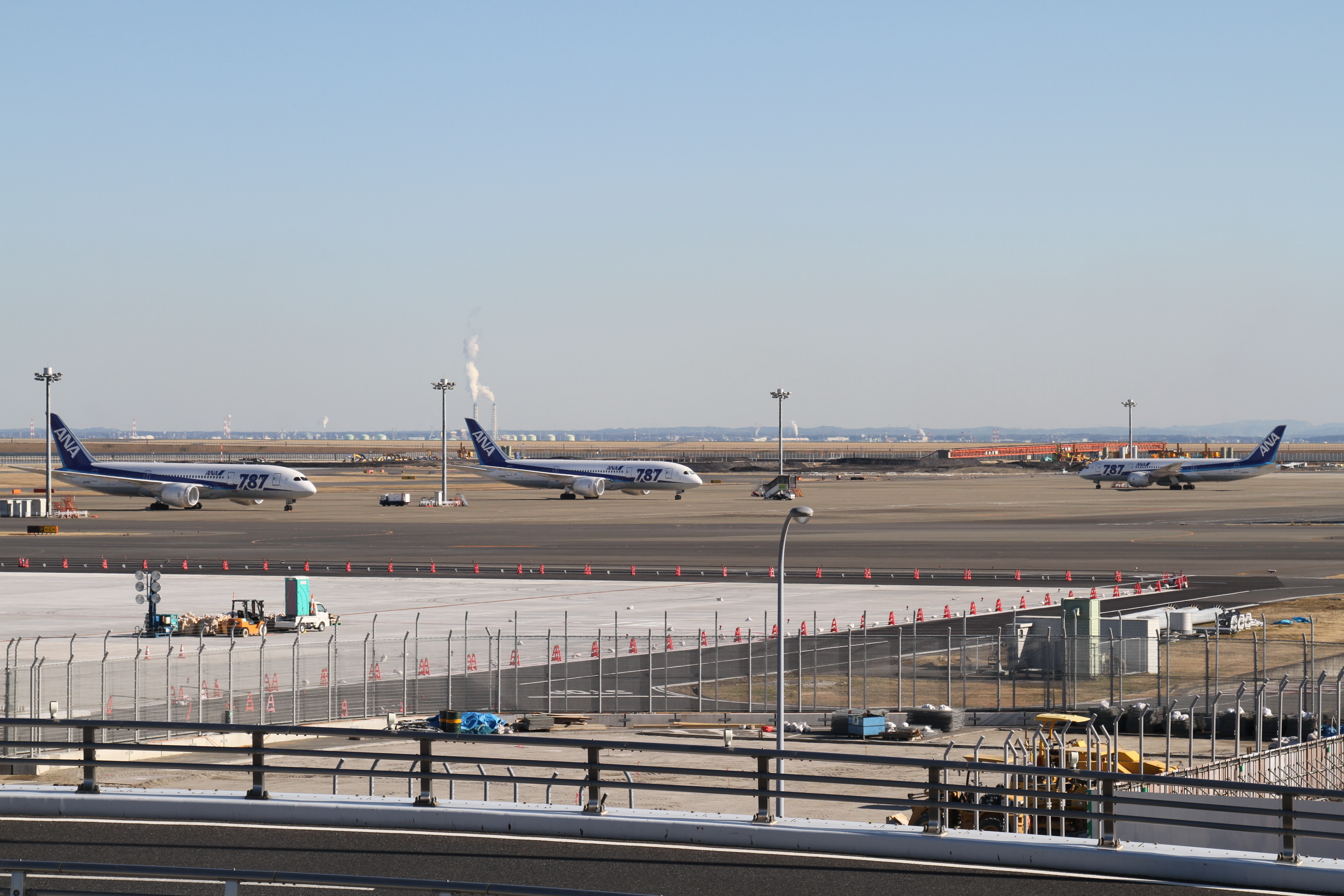
Three All Nippon Airways 787 aircraft grounded at Tokyo Airport on January 27, 2013

On January 20, the NTSB declared that overvoltage was not the cause of the Boston incident, as voltage did not exceed the battery limit of 32 V, and the charging unit passed tests. The battery had signs of short-circuiting and thermal runaway. Despite this, on January 24, the NTSB announced that it had not yet pinpointed the cause of the Boston fire; the FAA would not allow U.S.-based Dreamliners to fly again until the problem was found and corrected. In a press briefing that day, NTSB Chairwoman Deborah Hersman said that the NTSB had found evidence of the failure of multiple safety systems designed to prevent these battery problems and stated that fire must never happen on an aircraft. The Japan Transport Safety Board (JTSB) has said on January 23 that the battery in ANA jets in Japan reached a maximum voltage of 31 V (i.e. they were operating within the 32 V limit as the Boston JAL 787 had been), but had a sudden unexplained voltage drop to near zero. All cells had signs of thermal damage before the thermal runaway. ANA and JAL had already replaced several 787 batteries before the fires occurred. As of January 29, 2013, JTSB approved the Yuasa factory quality control while the American NTSB continues to look for defects in the Boston battery.

Industry experts disagreed on the consequences of the grounding: Boeing's competitor Airbus was confident that Boeing would resolve the issue and that no airlines would switch to a different type of aircraft, while other experts saw the problem as "costly" and said it "could take upwards of a year" to resolve.

Only two U.S.-based airlines operated the Dreamliner at the time – United Airlines and American Airlines. Chile's Directorate General of Civil Aviation (DGAC) grounded LAN Airlines' three 787s. The Indian Directorate General of Civil Aviation (DGCA) directed Air India to ground its six Dreamliners. The Japanese Transport Ministry made the ANA and JAL groundings official and indefinite following the FAA announcement. The European Aviation Safety Agency also followed the FAA's advice and grounded the only two European 787s, operated by LOT Polish Airlines. Qatar Airways announced it was grounding its five Dreamliners. Ethiopian Air was the final operator to announce temporary groundings, of its four Dreamliners.

As of January 17, 2013, all 50 of the aircraft were grounded. On January 18, Boeing announced that it was halting 787 deliveries until the battery problem was resolved. On February 4, 2013, the FAA permitted Boeing to conduct test flights of 787 aircraft to gather additional data.

== Solution ==
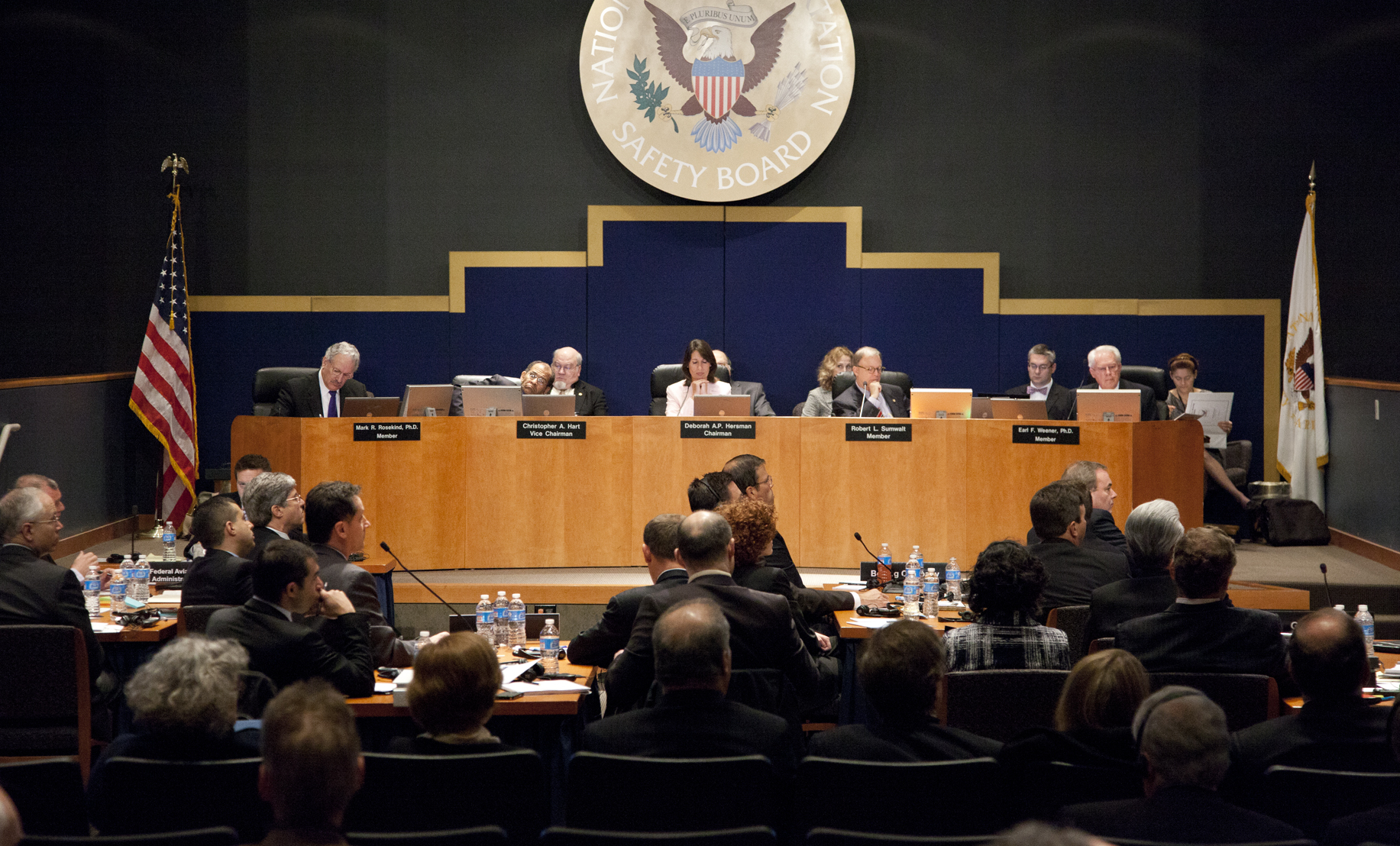
NTSB investigative hearing in April 2013

The Federal Aviation Administration decided on April 19, 2013, to allow U.S. Dreamliners to return to service after changes were made to better contain fires within their battery systems. Japanese authorities announced they were doing the same for their airplanes.

In 2013, concern remained that the solutions put in place by Boeing will not be able to cover the full range of possible failure modes. These include problems that may arise from poor systems integration between the engine indicating and crew alerting system (EICAS) and the battery management system.

A report adopted November 21, 2014, by the National Transportation Safety Board determined that "the probable cause of this incident was an internal short circuit within a cell [cell 5 or cell 6] of the auxiliary power unit (APU) lithium-ion battery, which led to a thermal runaway that cascaded to adjacent cells, resulting in the release of smoke and fire. The incident resulted from Boeing's failure to incorporate design requirements to mitigate the most severe effects of an internal short circuit within an APU battery cell and the Federal Aviation Administration's failure to identify this design deficiency during the type design certification process." The report also made recommendations to the FAA, Boeing, and the battery manufacturer.

The Japan Civil Aviation Bureau was reported to have called for Boeing to redesign the battery "beyond the recommendations from two previous investigations about the 2013 battery incidents by the Japan Transportation Safety Board (JTSB) and the US National Transportation Safety Board (NTSB)." The enclosure Boeing had to add was 185 lb (84 kg) heavier, negating the weight savings of using a lighter-weight battery.

== See also ==
- Boeing 737 MAX groundings
- Lithium ion battery § Safety
- Lithium cobalt oxide
- Plug-in electric vehicle fire incidents
- UPS Airlines Flight 6
