= Operating point =

Important point on a schematic diagram of a technical device

The operating point is a specific point within the operation characteristic of a technical device. This point will be engaged because of the properties of the system and the outside influences and parameters. In electronic engineering establishing an operating point is called biasing.

== Wanted and unwanted operating points of a system ==
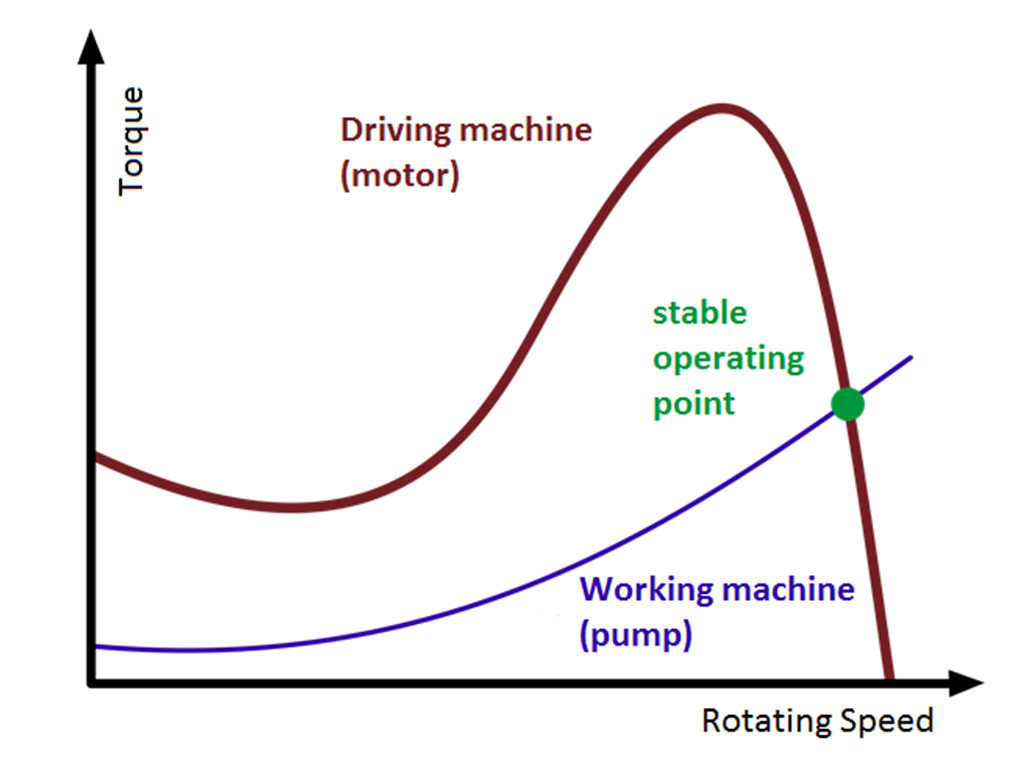
Operating point of a system consisting of drive (AC motor) and working machine (pump)

The operating point of a system is the intersection point of the torque-speed curve of drive and machine. Both devices are linked with a shaft so the speed is always identical. The drive creates the torque which rotates both devices. The machine creates the counter-torque, e.g. by being a moved device which needs permanent energy or a wheel turning against the static friction of the track.

- The drive speed increases when the driving torque is higher than the counter-torque.
- The drive speed decreases when the counter-torque is higher than the driving torque.

At the operating point, the driving torque and the counter-torque are balanced, so the speed does not change anymore.

- A speed change in a stable operating point creates a torque change which acts against this change of speed.

A change in speed out of this stable operating point is only possible with a new control intervention. This can be changing the load of the machine or the power of the drive which both changes the torque because it is a change in the characteristic curves. The drive-machine system then runs to a new operating point with a different speed and a different balance of torques.

Should the drive torque be higher than the counter torque at any time then the system does not have an operating point. The result will be that the speed increases up to the idle speed or even until destruction. Should the counter torque be higher at any times the speed will decrease until the system stops.

== Stable and unstable operating points ==
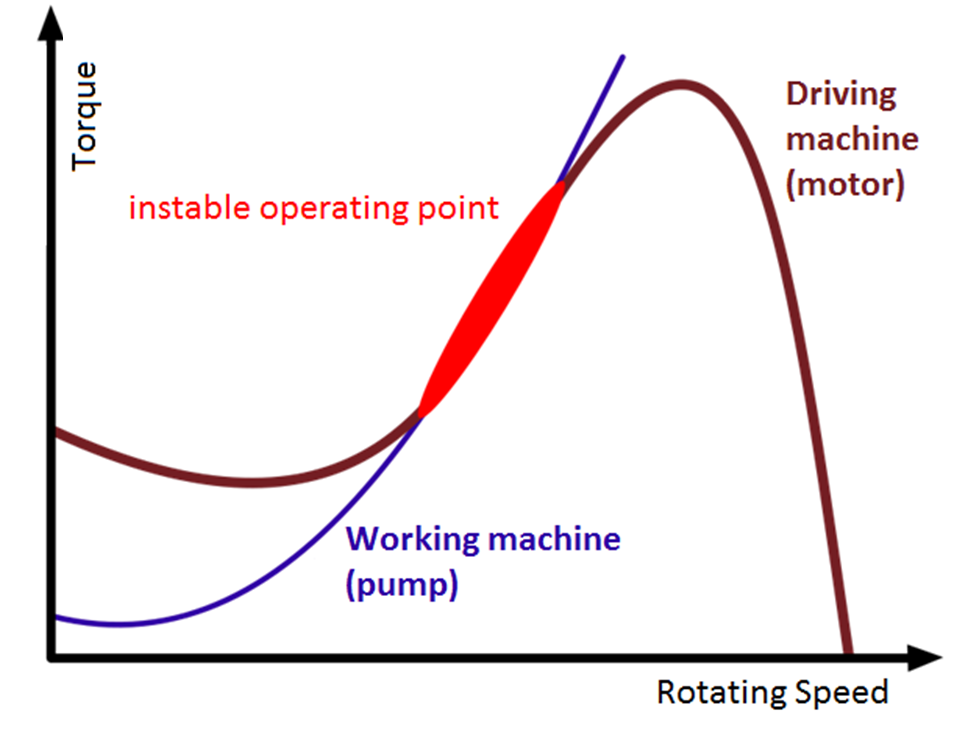
Unstable operating point of an engine consisting of drive (AC motor) and working machine (pump)

Also in case of an unstable operating point the law of the balance of the torques is always valid. But when the operating point is unstable then the characteristics of drive and machine are nearly parallel. In such a case a small change in torque will result in a big change of speed. In practice no device has a characteristics which is so thin that the intersection point can be clearly expected. Because of parallel characteristics, inner and outer friction as well as mechanical imperfections the unstable operating point is rather a band of possible operating states instead of a point. Running at an unstable operating point is therefore undesirable.

The middle point on the curve in the third picture on the right is an unstable point, too. However the above-mentioned assumptions are not valid here. Torque and speed are the same but in case the speed will be increased only little then the torque of the drive will be much higher than the counter-torque of the machine. The same but vice versa applies when reducing the speed. For this reason this operating point does not have a stabilizing effect on the speed. The speed will run away to the left or the right side of the point and the drive will run stable there.

== Wanted and unwanted operating points ==
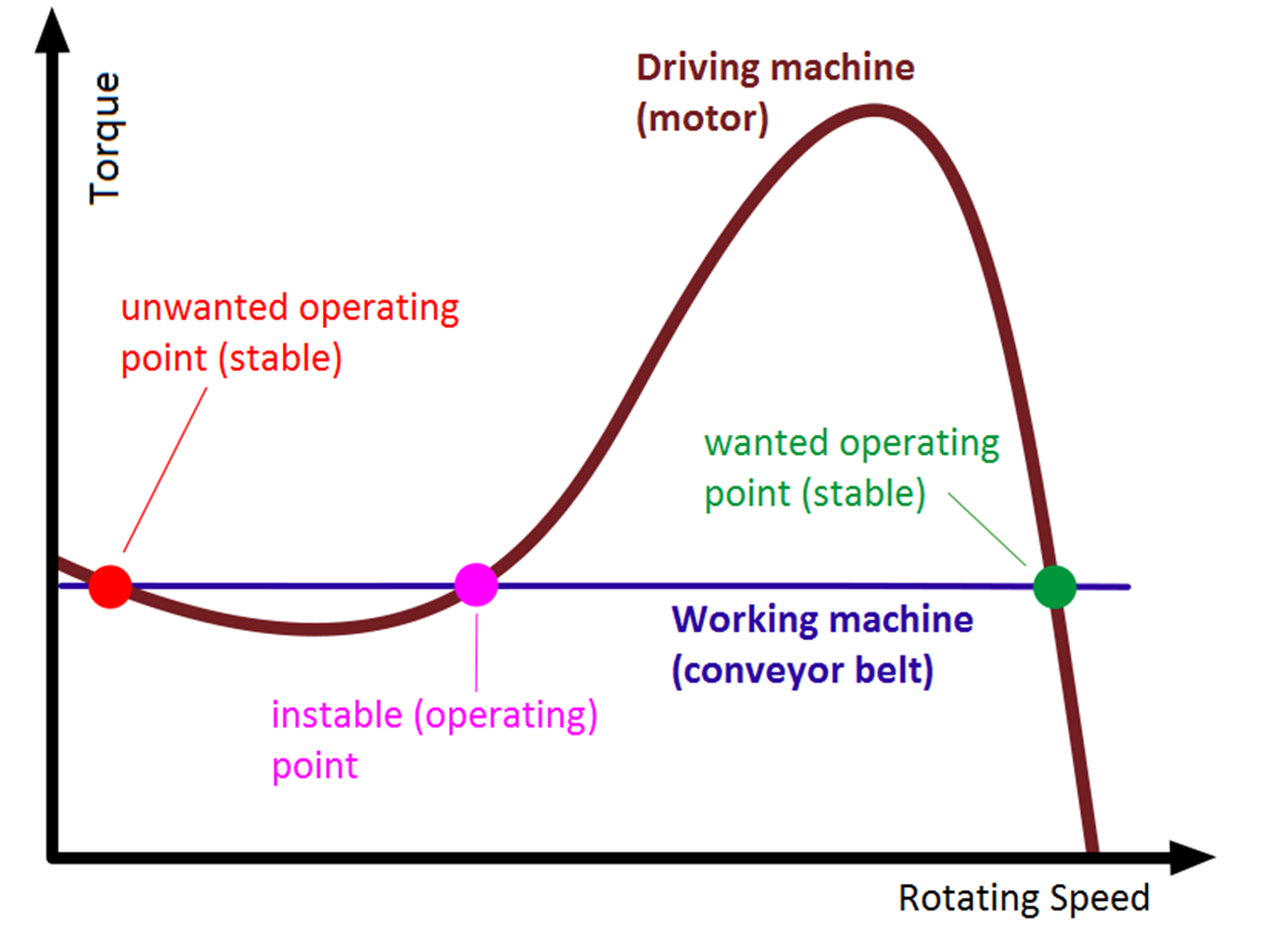
Wanted and unwanted operating points of an engine

In the lower right picture the electrical drive (AC motor) moves a conveyor belt. This type of machine has a nearly constant counter-torque over the whole range of speed. By choosing the incorrect drive (incorrect in size and type) there will be three possible operating points with the necessary working torque. Naturally the operating point with the highest speed is needed because only there will be the highest mechanical power (which is proportional to torque times speed). At the other operating points the majority of the electrical power (proportional only to the torque) will be only converted into heat inside the drive. Despite the bad power balance the drive can also overheat this way.

In the example shown in picture three the desired right operating point with same torque but higher speed (and therefore higher power) cannot be reached alone after starting the drive. The reason is the technically induced decrease of the drive characteristics in the middle of the curve. The speed will reach this area but not increase further. In case of such machines with constant torques a coupling can be used to prevent stopping during start up, it should be rotation speed dependent. (Of course a motor bigger in size would also do, but this is not as economical). With the coupling the counter torque will only be introduced when the load-less drive has reached a speed outside of the unstable working point. Then the drive can safely speed up. Alternatively a drive with an adequate characteristic can be chosen. In the past shunt-motors have been used for this purpose, nowadays asynchronous AC motors are being used or AC motors in combination with a variable frequency drive.

== Electronics ==
In an electronic amplifier, an operating point is a combination of current and voltage at "no signal" conditions; application of a signal to the stage - changes voltage and current in the stage. The operating point in an amplifier is set by the intersection of the load line with the non-linear characteristics of the device. By adjusting the bias on the stage, an operating point can be selected that maximizes the signal output of the stage and minimizes distortion.
