= Vacuum tube characteristics =

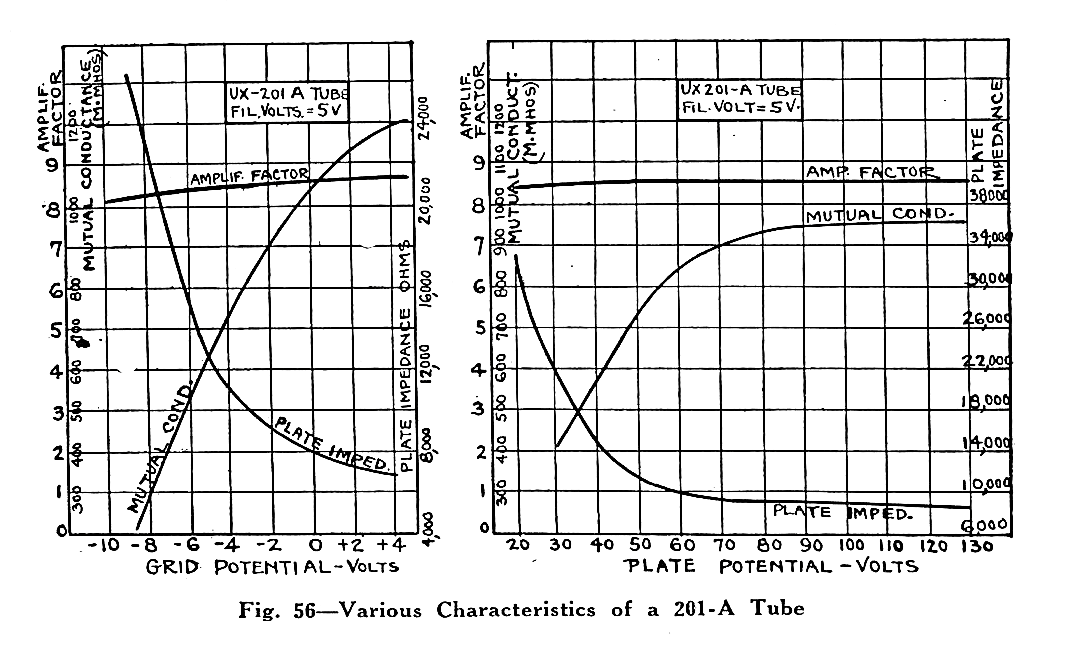
201A triode characteristics from a 1930 textbook.

Vacuum tube characteristics (also called tube curves, valve characteristics or valve curves) describes the electrical relationships between electrode voltages and currents in a vacuum tube. These relationships are commonly presented as characteristic curves in tube manuals and engineering references. The curves typically show plate current versus plate voltage for several fixed control-grid voltages, showing how current varies with electrode potentials under controlled conditions. Designers use them to select operating points, determine voltage gain, estimate output power, and construct graphical load-line analyses. The use of characteristic curves as an engineering tool for analyzing vacuum-tube operation was established in the 1910s, notably in work by Edwin Howard Armstrong. Examples of such curves appear in early tube manuals and textbooks and form the basis of classical vacuum-tube circuit design.

Different types of vacuum tubes are characterized using plots appropriate to their electrode structure and intended use. Two-electrode devices such as diodes are described primarily by the relation between plate voltage and plate current. Amplifying tubes containing control grids, such as triodes, tetrodes, pentodes, and beam tetrodes, are represented by families of curves measured for different grid voltages. From these families additional parameters such as amplification factor (μ), transconductance (g_{m}), and plate resistance (r_{p}) may be obtained.

Although these plots are used primarily for circuit design, their shapes arise from the underlying physics of electron flow in vacuum tubes. The physical principles responsible for the observed characteristics are discussed in later sections.

== 3/2 power law ==
In high-vacuum thermionic diodes operating under normal conditions, plate current $I_\text{p}$ increases nonlinearly with plate voltage $V_\text{p}$. Over the space-charge-limited region, the current is well approximated by the three-halves power relation

$$I_\text{p} = P \cdot V_\text{p}^{3/2}$$

where $P$ is the perveance of the tube.

Perveance is determined primarily by electrode geometry, including cathode area and cathode-to-plate spacing. It provides a practical measure of current-producing capability and is often used in tube manuals in place of a complete family of plate-characteristic curves.

== Signal diode characterization ==
Anode current (I_{a}) versus anode voltage (V_{a}) for a 303A thermionic diode under fixed heater conditions.

For small-signal diodes, tube manuals typically publish a single static anode characteristic showing anode current (I_{a}) as a function of anode voltage (V_{a}), measured with the heater operating at its rated voltage. Because the diode contains no control grid, only one such I–V curve is required. The low-voltage portion of the curve is particularly important in detector service, where the nonlinear curvature of the current–voltage relation allows a small alternating signal to produce a net direct-current output, resulting in rectification.

In addition to the static characteristic, tube manuals specify heater ratings, maximum plate voltage, permissible average current, and interelectrode capacitance. These parameters define the allowable operating region and high-frequency behavior.

Another typical data sheet for a diode is for the Philips EB91 double diode. This book includes curves of the diode response in use as a detector. The output voltage is non-zero for an input voltage of 0 due to the Edison effect.

== Rectifier characterization ==
Vacuum-tube rectifiers intended for power-supply service are specified differently from signal diodes. Their data emphasize heater requirements, peak inverse voltage, maximum peak plate current, permissible DC output current for various filter configurations, and regulation characteristics.

Rectifier tubes exhibit nonlinear voltage drop that increases with current. For limited operating ranges this behavior may be represented by an equivalent or effective series resistance corresponding to the local slope of the plate characteristic (dynamic plate resistance, dV/dI). Diode voltages can be determied by use of a graphical aide.

In capacitor-input supplies, conduction occurs in pulses near the peaks of the AC waveform, producing peak currents substantially greater than the average DC load current. Data sheets therefore specify maximum peak plate current and permissible filter capacitance in addition to average DC ratings.

Under varying load conditions, the supply voltage changes in accordance with the rectifier's nonlinear characteristic and effective impedance.

== Triode characterization ==
=== Early use ===
The systematic use of characteristic curves to explain and quantify vacuum-tube amplification was introduced by Edwin Howard Armstrong in 1914. Using measured plate voltage-current curves, Armstrong demonstrated the mechanism of triode amplification and clarified the operation of grid-leak detection.

==== Plate and transfer characteristics ====
Triode data sheets present families of plate characteristics showing plate current $I_p$ as a function of plate voltage $E_p$ for several fixed grid voltages $E_g$. From these curves the operating point, voltage gain, and load-line behavior may be determined graphically.

In normal operation, plate current depends on both grid and plate voltage. Classical analysis shows that the characteristics for different grid voltages are similar in form and differ primarily by horizontal displacement.

In triodes, plate current may be approximated by

$I_p = k\left(E_g + \frac{E_p}{\mu}\right)^{3/2}$

where $E_g$ is the grid voltage, $E_p$ the plate voltage, $\mu$ the amplification factor, and $k$ a constant determined by the tube geometry..

The amplification factor μ represents the relative effectiveness of grid voltage compared with plate voltage in controlling current. It is fundamentally determined by structural dimensions, particularly grid-to-cathode spacing relative to plate-to-cathode spacing.

==== Small-signal parameters ====
Triodes are commonly characterized by three interrelated small-signal parameters:

- Amplification factor ($\mu$) — the change in plate voltage divided by the change in grid voltage at constant plate current:

$\mu = \left(\frac{\partial E_p}{\partial E_g}\right)_{I_p}$

- Transconductance ($g_m$) — the change in plate current divided by the change in grid voltage at constant plate voltage:

$g_m = \left(\frac{\partial I_p}{\partial E_g}\right)_{E_p}$

- Plate resistance ($r_p$) — the change in plate voltage divided by the change in plate current at constant grid voltage:

$r_p = \left(\frac{\partial E_p}{\partial I_p}\right)_{E_g}$

These parameters are related by

$\mu = g_m r_p$

as shown in classical tube theory treatments.

These parameters are obtained either from slopes of the characteristic curves or from tabulated operating-point data.

==== Comparison of ECC81, ECC82, and ECC83 ====
ECC81 mu=60

ECC82 mu=17

ECC83 mu=100

The ECC81, ECC82, and ECC83 (also known respectively as 12AT7, 12AU7, and 12AX7) are closely related dual triodes widely used in small-signal amplifier stages. Although similar in construction and envelope size, they differ significantly in electrical parameters due to differences in electrode spacing and grid structure.

Parameter	ECC81 (12AT7)	ECC82 (12AU7)	ECC83 (12AX7)
Typical amplification factor $(\mu)$	~60	~20	~100
Typical transconductance $g_m$	High	Moderate	Lower
Typical plate resistance (rp)$(r_p)$	Moderate	Low	High
Typical application emphasis	Driver / RF / phase inverter	Low-gain voltage amp / driver	High-gain voltage amplification

(Data representative of manufacturer specifications.)

The ECC83 exhibits high $\mu$ and high plate resistance, producing large voltage gain but relatively low current drive capability. The ECC82 has lower $\mu$ and lower plate resistance, allowing greater current delivery and reduced voltage gain. The ECC81 occupies an intermediate position with comparatively high transconductance and moderate amplification factor.

These differences arise primarily from variations in grid pitch, cathode area, and electrode spacing, which determine perveance and amplification factor. Although the external envelope is similar, the internal geometry governs the characteristic curves and small-signal parameters.

== Tetrode (screen-grid) characterization ==
Western Electric UY-224-A screen-grid tetrode plate characteristics. Red curves show plate current (Ip) versus plate voltage (Ep) for several control-grid voltages with the screen grid held at 90 V; the blue curve shows screen-grid current (Is). In the flat region Ip changes little with Ep, indicating the high dynamic plate resistance of tetrodes. At lower plate voltages a secondary-emission region ("kink") appears, where plate current decreases and screen current increases as secondary electrons from the plate are attracted to the screen grid.

The screen-grid tube (tetrode) was developed primarily to reduce the electrostatic coupling between plate and control grid that limited gain and stability in radio-frequency triode amplifiers. In triodes, the grid–plate capacitance provides feedback from plate to grid, restricting obtainable gain and often requiring neutralization circuits such as those used in neutrodyne receivers. By inserting a positively biased screen grid between control grid and plate, this capacitive coupling is greatly reduced, permitting higher stable gain at radio frequencies.

The screen grid, also known as the shield grid or grid 2 (to distinguish it from the control grid, grid 1), appeared in commercially available tubes about 1928. In some designs the screen grid was extended so that it substantially enclosed the plate structure, emphasizing its function as an electrostatic shield between control grid and plate. In early radio-frequency amplifiers this shielding approach often continued beyond the tube itself, with grounded shields incorporated into the bulb structure and surrounding equipment to minimize feedback. The resulting reduction of grid–plate feedback allows much higher amplification factors than in triodes; for example, the RCA type 224A tetrode has an amplification factor of about 420 compared with about 8.5 for the earlier 201A triode.

When electrons strike a metal electrode with sufficient energy, additional electrons may be emitted from the surface. These are known as secondary electrons. The number emitted depends on the energy of the incident electrons and on the condition of the metal surface, including absorbed gases and other contaminants. In some cases the number of secondary electrons emitted may exceed the number of primary electrons striking the surface, so that the net current to the electrode becomes negative.

In a screen-grid tetrode, secondary electrons emitted from the plate are influenced by the potentials of the surrounding electrodes. When the plate voltage falls below the screen-grid voltage, many of the low-energy secondary electrons emitted from the plate are attracted to the screen grid rather than returning to the plate. The diversion of these electrons decreases the plate current and increases the screen current, producing the characteristic "kink" in the plate-current curves.

The number of secondary electrons emitted from a metal surface may exceed the number of incident primary electrons, a condition often described by a secondary-emission ratio greater than unity. Most secondary electrons have relatively low kinetic energies, typically only a few electron volts.

Secondary electrons are emitted with a wide distribution of velocities, although most have energies equivalent to only a few volts. Because of this distribution the transition between the secondary-emission region and normal operation occurs gradually rather than abruptly as the plate voltage approaches the screen-grid potential.

Because of this effect, practical operation of screen-grid tetrodes is confined to the flat portion of the plate-current characteristics where the plate voltage remains well above the screen voltage. If the instantaneous plate voltage falls into the secondary-emission region, the resulting reduction of plate current produces severe distortion of the output signal.

Characteristic curves of screen-grid tubes such as the RCA type 224 show the following features:

- Increased plate resistance compared with triodes.
- A region of secondary-emission instability when plate voltage approaches the screen voltage.
- Redistribution of current between plate and screen.
- Cathode current equal to the sum of plate and screen currents.

These effects limit useful operation of the tetrode to the flat portion of the curves, where the plate voltage is greater than the screen voltage and plate current is relatively independent of plate voltage. The suppressor grid in a pentode prevents secondary electrons emitted from the plate from reaching the screen grid, eliminating the characteristic kink visible in the tetrode plate-current curves.

Because plate current in a screen-grid tetrode remains sensitive to the relative potentials of the plate and screen grid, early tetrodes had limitations in audio-frequency power applications where wide plate-voltage swings are required. These limitations motivated the development of improved multi-electrode tubes in which secondary emission is suppressed and the plate characteristics become smoother and more nearly horizontal.

Two principal solutions emerged. In the pentode, a suppressor grid is added to repel secondary electrons back to the plate. In the beam tetrode, secondary emission is suppressed by shaping the electron stream into concentrated beams using aligned grids and beam-forming plates. In both designs the plate current depends primarily on control-grid voltage and only weakly on plate voltage. The resulting high dynamic plate resistance and wide dynamic range simplify amplifier design.

== Pentode characterization ==
Tetrode kink caused by secondary emission, compared to pentode with suppressor at cathode voltage

6AU6 showing pentode characteristics

The characteristic "kink" observed in the plate curves of screen-grid tetrodes arises from secondary emission at the plate. When the plate voltage falls to a value comparable to or lower than the screen-grid voltage, secondary electrons emitted from the plate are attracted to the positively biased screen grid. The diversion of these electrons reduces plate current and increases screen current, producing a region of negative slope in the plate characteristics and making the plate current strongly dependent on the relative plate and screen potentials. In the pentode, a suppressor grid (g3) is inserted between screen and plate and normally connected to the cathode. This grid establishes a low-potential region near the plate that repels secondary electrons back to the plate, thereby eliminating the kink and greatly increasing the effective plate resistance. Typical pentode characteristics, such as those of the 6AU6, show plate current substantially independent of plate voltage over the normal operating region, with corresponding reduction in screen-current variation. The pentode was patented by engineers at Philips.

Pentodes quickly displaced earlier screen-grid tetrodes in most applications after their introduction in 1929 because they eliminated the secondary-emission instability. Pentodes are used as radio-frequency amplifiers, constant-current sources, and audio power output stages.

The EL34 is a current production power pentode used for audio amplification.

Beam tetrodes provide an alternative solution to the secondary-emission problem using electron-beam focusing rather than a suppressor grid.

== Beam tetrode characterization ==
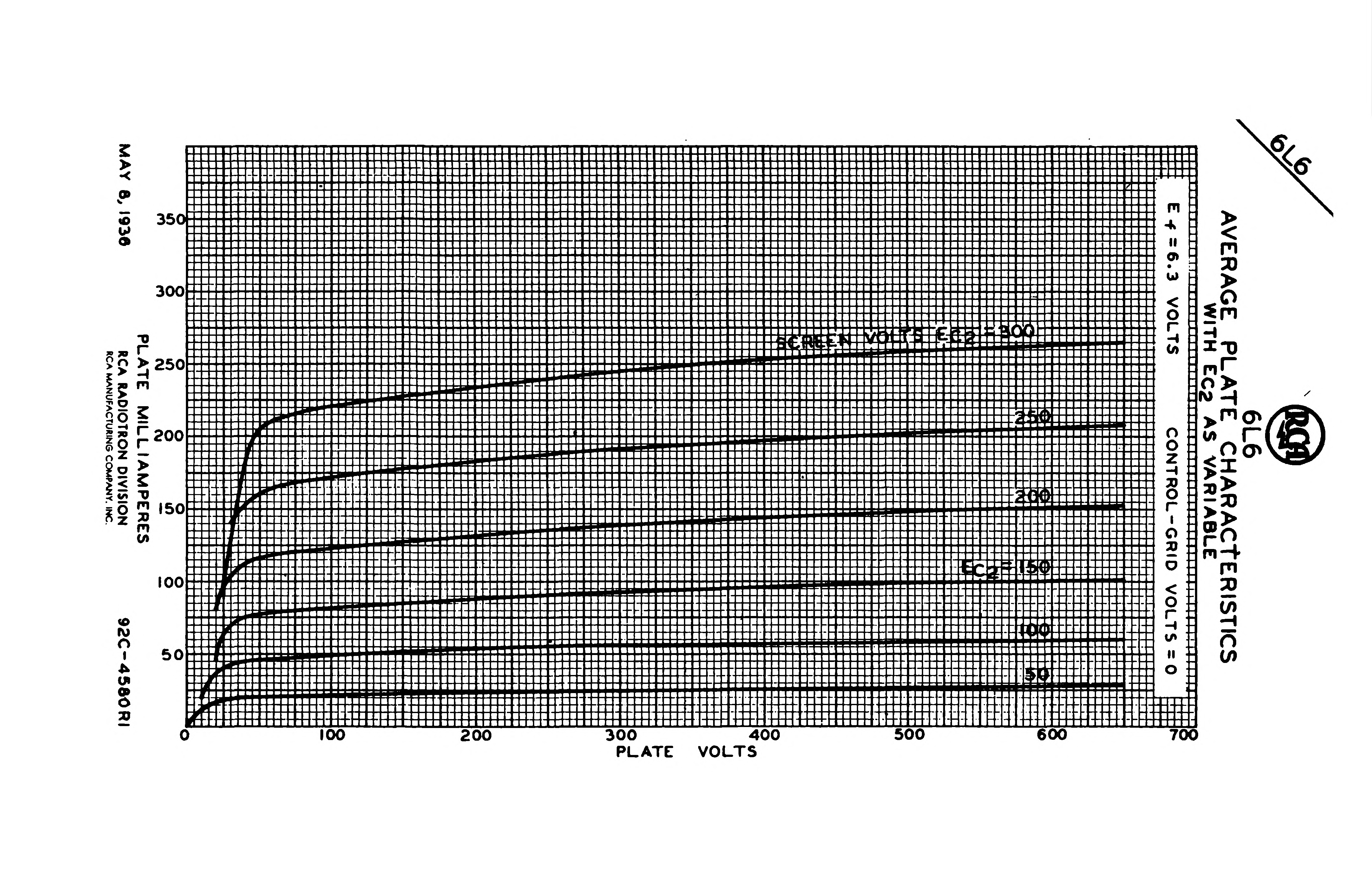
6L6 beam tetrode plate characteristics

An alternative solution to the secondary-emission problem is the beam tetrode configuration. Instead of employing a suppressor grid, the beam tetrode uses aligned control-grid and screen-grid wires together with beam-forming plates to concentrate the electron stream into narrow sheets between the grids. This geometry produces a low-potential space-charge region between the screen grid and the plate that repels secondary electrons back to the plate, eliminating the characteristic tetrode kink. Plate characteristics of beam power tubes such as the 6L6 show nearly horizontal current contours over the normal operating region; the small slope of these curves corresponds to a high dynamic plate resistance comparable to that of a pentode. Historically, the beam power tube configuration was developed in the 1930s as a practical means of obtaining pentode-like performance without employing the Philips suppressor-grid pentode structure, which was protected by patent.

=== Physical interpretation of characteristic curves ===
The preceding sections emphasize the practical characterization of vacuum tubes as presented in tube manuals. The forms of these characteristic curves arise from the physics of electron flow in vacuum and from the electrostatic fields created by the tube electrodes.

==== From diode to triode ====
In a simple thermionic diode operating in the space-charge-limited region, the plate current follows the three-halves power relation

$I_p=P V_p^{3/2}$

where P is the perveance determined primarily by electrode geometry.

When a control grid is inserted between cathode and plate, the electrostatic field near the cathode is modified. Classical analysis shows that the plate current may be approximated by

$I_p = k {(Eg + Ep/\mu)}^{3/2}$

where $\mu$ is the amplification factor and $k$ depends on electrode geometry.

The amplification factor μ represents the relative effectiveness of grid voltage compared with plate voltage in controlling plate current. Its magnitude is determined largely by the structural dimensions of the tube, particularly the spacing between grid and cathode relative to that between plate and cathode.

==== Triode, tetrode, and pentode comparison ====
In a triode, the plate retains significant electrostatic influence over the electron stream. As a result, plate current varies appreciably with plate voltage, producing curved plate characteristics and moderate plate resistance.

The addition of a screen grid in a tetrode reduces the influence of plate voltage on the space charge by electrostatic shielding. This substantially increases plate resistance and produces flatter plate-characteristic curves. However, secondary electrons emitted from the plate may be attracted to the screen grid when the plate voltage approaches or falls below the screen voltage, producing the characteristic tetrode "kink".

In a pentode, a suppressor grid inserted between screen and plate repels secondary electrons back to the plate. This suppresses the kink and allows plate current to remain nearly independent of plate voltage over a wide operating region.

Beam tetrodes achieve a similar result without a suppressor grid by shaping the electron stream into concentrated beams and aligning the screen and plate structures to form a low-potential space-charge region that returns secondary electrons to the plate.

==== Relation to published characteristics ====
These structural differences explain the forms of the characteristic curves published in tube manuals. Triodes exhibit strong dependence of plate current on plate voltage, resulting in curved characteristics and moderate plate resistance. Tetrodes, pentodes, and beam tetrodes progressively reduce the influence of plate voltage on the electron stream, producing flatter plate-current curves and higher effective plate resistance.

The commonly published tube parameters $\mu$, $g_m$, and $r_p$ arise directly from these relationships between electrode geometry, electrostatic fields, and electron flow within the tube.
