= Vehicle fire =

Uncontrolled burning involving a motor vehicle

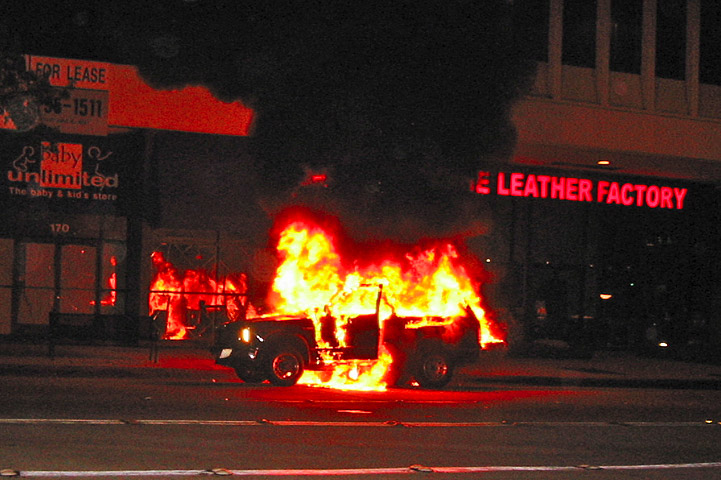
An SUV on fire in Pasadena, California

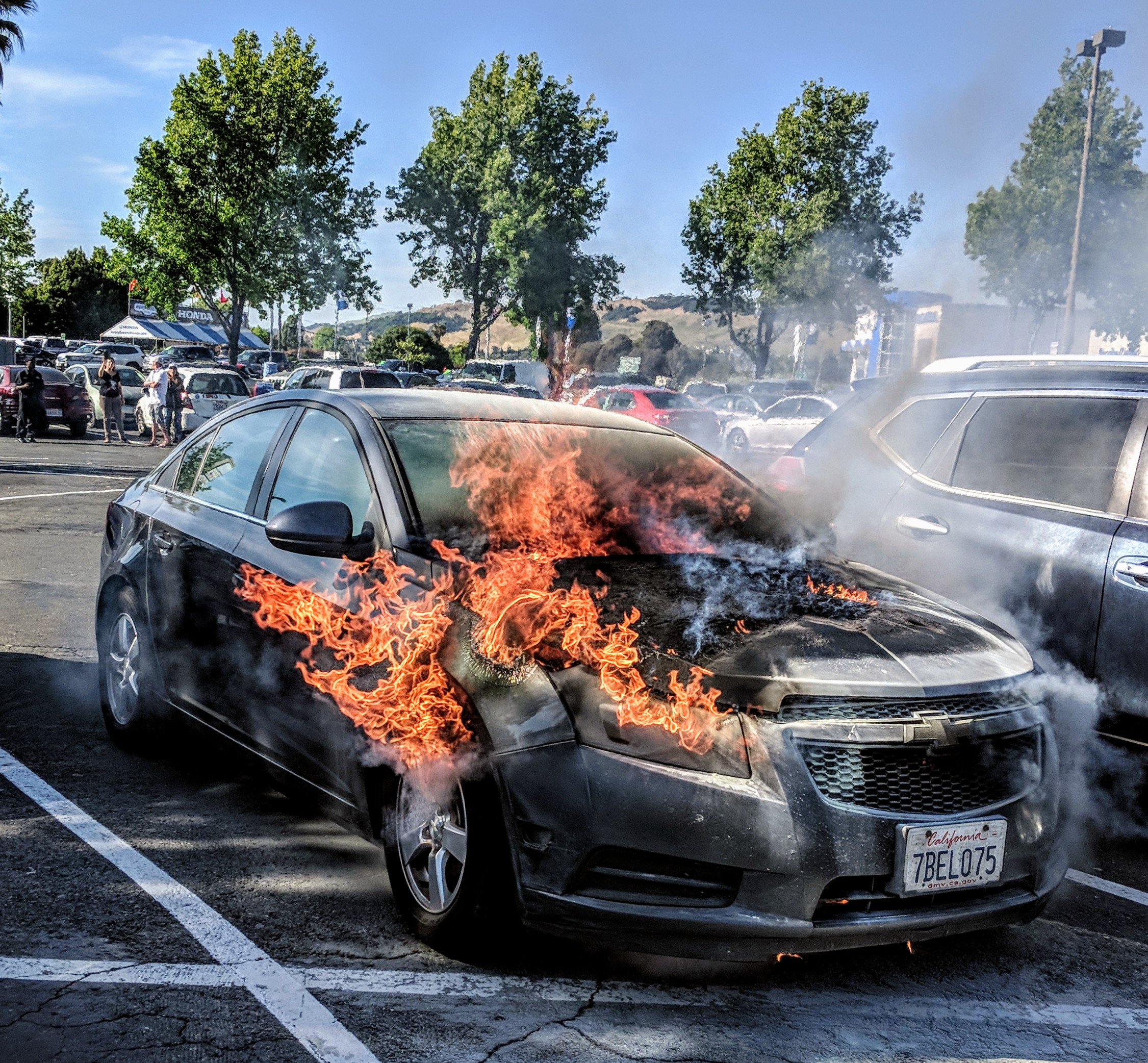
A car engine on fire in Vallejo, California

A dash camera video of a truck on fire in Estonia, fire truck and police driving, later transportation

A vehicle fire is an undesired conflagration (uncontrolled burning) involving a motor vehicle. Also termed car fire, it is one of the most common causes of fire-related property damage.

== Causes ==
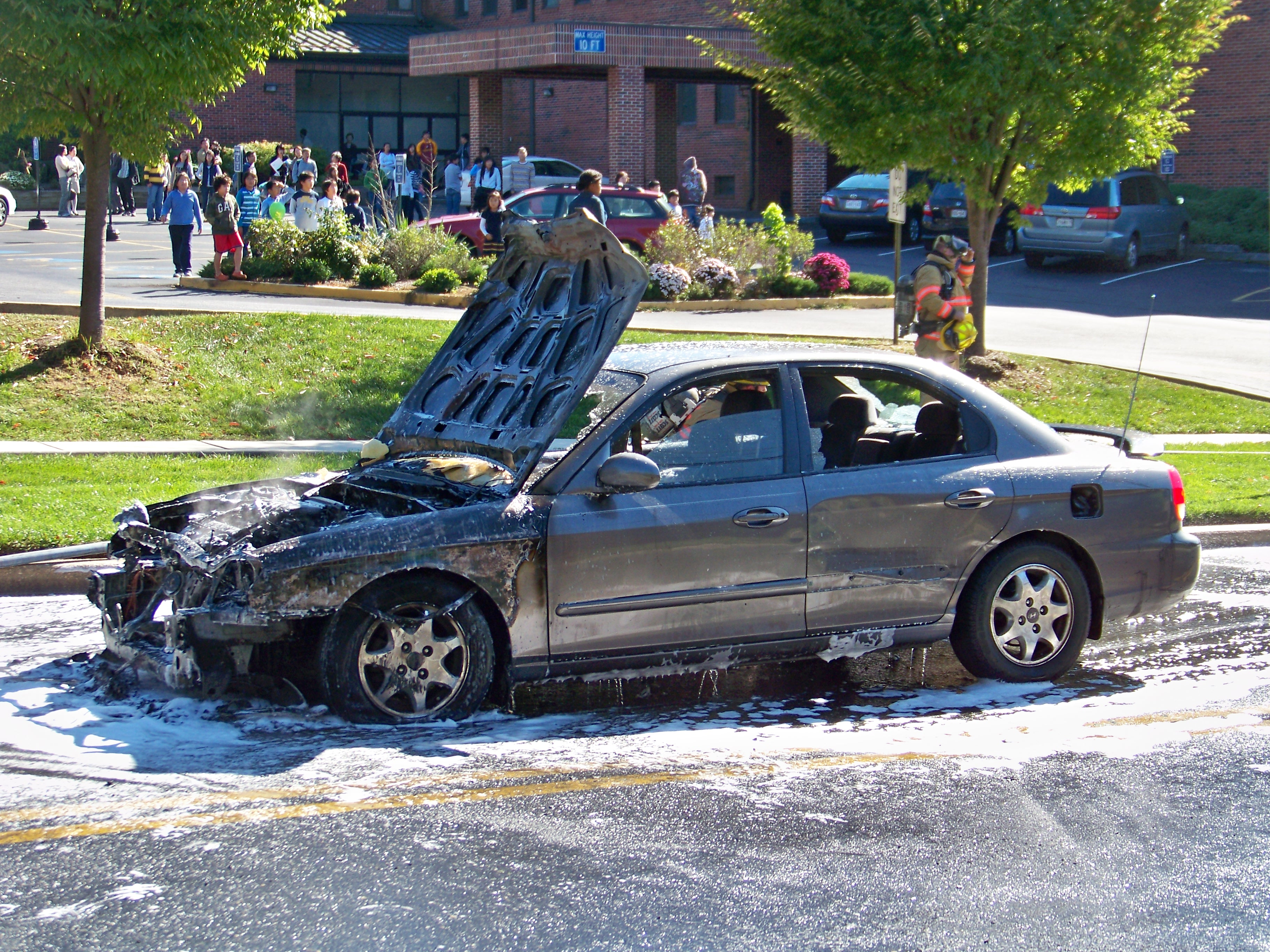
Aftermath of a car fire in Silver Spring, Maryland.

It can be challenging to determine the cause of a vehicular fire. In 23 percent of the cases of highway vehicle fires reported during the 2014-6 period to the U.S. Fire Administration’s National Fire Incident Reporting System, no cause had been determined. As at July 2018, another 10 percent of these reported cases were still under investigation. In 38 percent of the cases, investigators concluded that the fire resulted from either careless behavior or accidental actions. The failure of powered equipment, such as an electrical motor or a fan, was considered causal in 21 percent of the cases. Fires caused by intentional actions, such as arson, accounted for 5 percent of the cases; but the report cautions that this may be an undercount. Arson, being a crime, is no longer being reported to the U.S. National Fire Administration but is instead reported to its Federal Bureau of Investigation. The report further cautions that, due "to the volume of fires, many automobile fires are not investigated for possible arson."

=== Accidental ===
A motor vehicle contains many types of flammable materials, including liquids like gasoline and oil as well as solid combustibles such as hoses. Fuel leaks from ruptured fuel lines also can rapidly ignite, especially in petrol-fuelled cars where sparks are possible in the engine compartment. Fires with casualties have been caused by ozone cracking of nitrile rubber fuel lines for example.

Vehicles house multiple potential sources of ignition including electrical devices that may short circuit, hot exhaust systems, and modern car devices such as air bag detonators.

It is often the case in accidental auto fires that the bulk of the fire is (at least initially) contained in the engine compartment of the vehicle. In most vehicles, the passenger compartment is protected from engine compartment fire by a firewall. However, in case of arson, the fire does not always start in the interior or spread there. It is mandatory to carry an in-car fire extinguisher in some countries, such as Belgium, Bulgaria and Poland.

From 2003 to 2007 in the United States, there were 280,000 car fires per year, which caused 480 deaths.

=== Arson ===
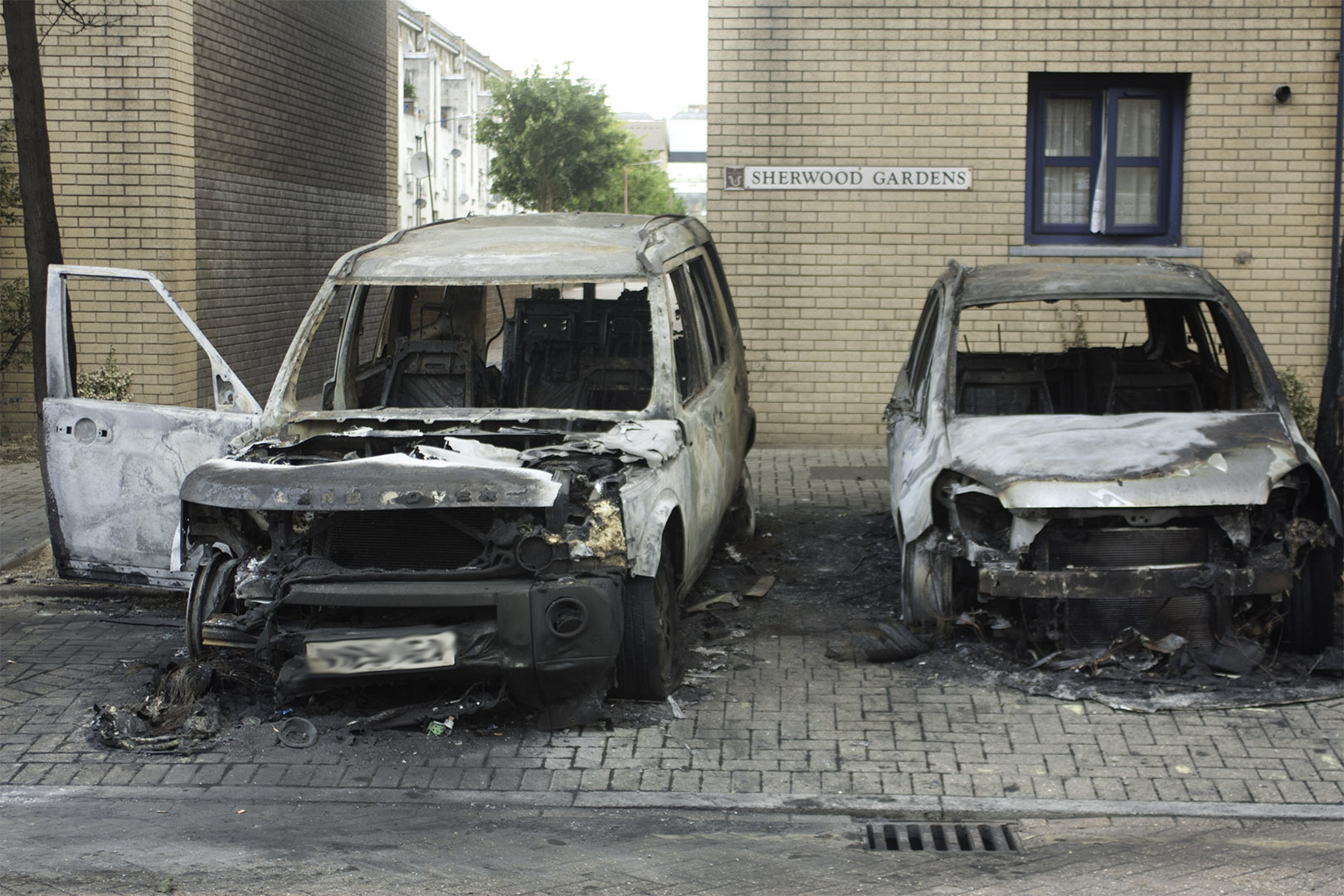
Cars destroyed by arson in Hackney, London after the 2011 England riots

In 2017, a study in the UK found that accidental car fires were declining but deliberate car fires (arson) are increasing. At that time, in the UK, there were approximately the same number of deliberate car fires as accidental car fires.

Over the 2010-24 period, the rate of "suspected deliberate vehicle fires" had trebled in County Durham; but the overall rate of such incidents in the UK had halved. "A BBC investigation found that last year [2023] fire crews in the north-east of England were called an average of more than 20 times a week to vehicles being set alight."

In France, widespread arson of cars is regularly committed by youths during New Year's Eve celebrations. This began during the 1990's in poorer areas of Strasbourg, but has since spread nation-wide.

In Sweden, more than 100 cars were set on fire on August 14, 2018. "On average, there are four incidents a day in Sweden, and August is the month where we tend to have the most burning cars," said Manne Gerell, a criminologist affiliated with Malmö University.

== Hazard assessment ==
In 2024, the fire hazard of modern vehicles was assessed in the context of parking garages and vehicle carriers. This hazard has been affected by changes in vehicle design, fuels, and the equipment used during charging or refueling the vehicle. In particular, changes in vehicle construction and in their power sources (a fuel tank and/or a battery) have affected the peak heat release rate, the duration of the fire, and the heat flux to nearby objects. The report also surveys ways in which the fire hazard can be mitigated by fire protection systems.

== See also ==
- Ford Pinto
- Forensic engineering
- Plug-in electric vehicle fire incidents
- Vauxhall Zafira
