= UPS Airlines Flight 6 =

2010 aviation accident in the United Arab Emirates

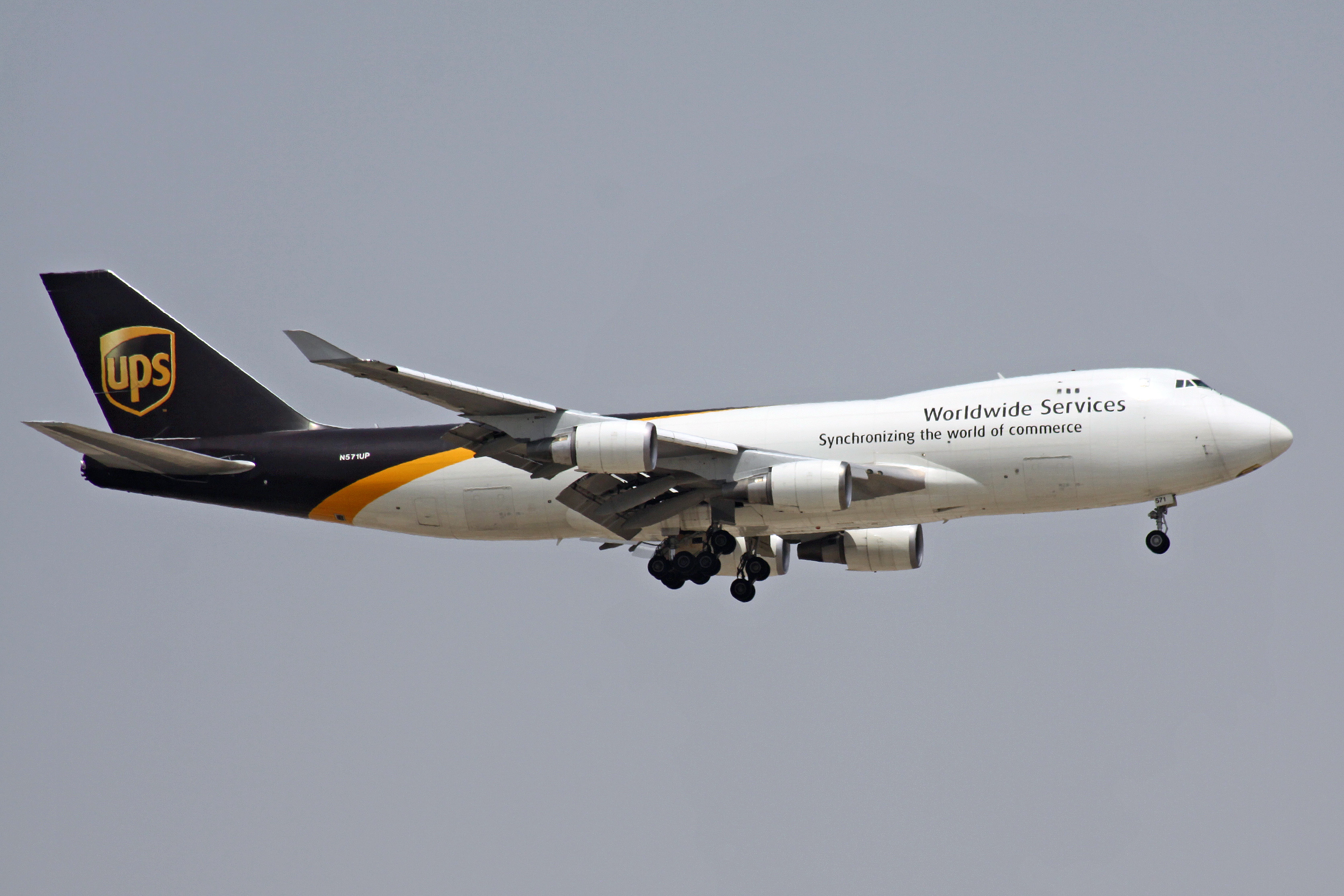
- N571UP, the aircraft involved, seen the day before the crash

Accident
- Date: 3 September 2010
- Summary: Crashed following uncontained in-flight cargo fire
- Site: Nad Al Sheba Military camp, near Dubai International Airport, Dubai, United Arab Emirates; 25.103520°N 55.362471°E

Aircraft
- Aircraft type: Boeing 747-44AF/SCD
- Operator: UPS Airlines
- IATA flight No.: 5X6
- ICAO flight No.: UPS6
- Call sign: UPS 6
- Registration: N571UP
- Flight origin: Dubai International Airport, Dubai, United Arab Emirates
- Destination: Cologne Bonn Airport, Germany
- Occupants: 2
- Crew: 2
- Fatalities: 2
- Survivors: 0

UPS Airlines Flight 6 was a scheduled international cargo flight operated by UPS Airlines. On September 3, 2010, the Boeing 747-400 flying the route between Dubai, United Arab Emirates, and Cologne, Germany, developed an in-flight fire, which caused the aircraft to crash, killing both crew members, the only people on board. It was the first fatal air crash for UPS Airlines. The accident prompted a re-evaluation of safety procedures protecting airliners from cockpit smoke.

== Background ==
=== Aircraft ===
The aircraft involved was a Boeing 747-44AF which was registered as N571UP with serial number 35668. It was manufactured by Boeing Commercial Airplanes in 2007 and it received its airworthiness certification on September 26. It had flown for more than 10,000 hours, and had a major inspection performed in June 2010. The aircraft was powered by four General Electric CF6-80C2-B5FG01 turbofan engines, and was among the newest (#1,393 of 1,418; the 26th from the last) Boeing 747-400s built before the introduction of the succeeding 747-8.

=== Crew ===
The designated crew were Captain Douglas Lampe (48), of Louisville, Kentucky, and First Officer Matthew Bell (38), from Sanford, Florida. Lampe had been flying for UPS Airlines for 15 years and had over 11,000 flight hours, with 4,000 hours flying in the Boeing 747-400. Bell had 4 years and 5,500 hours respectively, with 77 hours in the 747-400.

== Accident ==
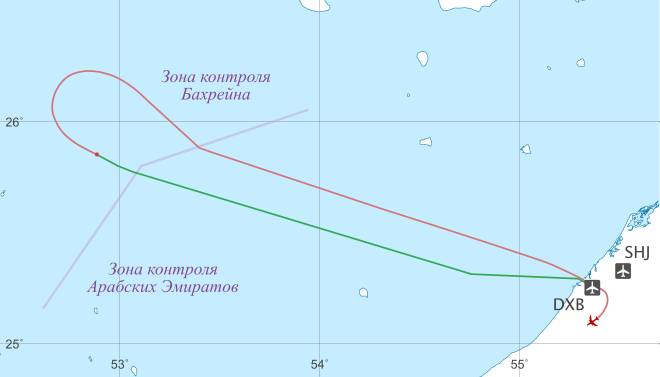
UPS Airlines Flight 6's flight path

After arriving from Hong Kong earlier in the day, Flight 6 departed from Dubai International Airport at 18:53 local time (14:53 UTC) on September 3, 2010, bound for Cologne Bonn Airport in Germany.

At 19:15, the EICAS message FIRE MAIN DK FWD appeared on the upper EICAS display, and the crew reported fire in the cockpit when the aircraft was around 120 nautical miles (138 mi; 222 km) west-northwest of Dubai. An emergency was declared shortly afterward. The pilots were under the control of Bahrain's air traffic control (ATC), and they could not initially contact Dubai ATC because of thick smoke entering the flight deck that obscured the radio panel. Although they were offered a diversion 100 nautical miles (115 mi; 185 km) to Doha, Qatar, Captain Lampe decided to return to Dubai. The thick smoke required the pilots to communicate with nearby planes over VHF to relay messages to Bahrain ATC, as Bell was unable to see the radio through the smoke. The aircraft involved in relaying messages from UPS 6 included three Boeing 737-800s operated by Flydubai, and the Dubai Royal Air Wing's own 747-400, callsign Dubai One.

Lampe disengaged the autopilot to fly the plane manually. Upon doing so, he discovered that he had no elevator control. The fire had burned through the protective fire-resistant liner that covered the cargo hold and destroyed the primary flight control system, crippling the 747. At 19:20, Lampe's oxygen mask failed and he relinquished command of the plane to First Officer Bell. Captain Lampe subsequently left his seat to retrieve the emergency reserve oxygen system (EROS) oxygen mask, which was stowed behind his seat. However, he lost consciousness soon after as a result of hypoxia after inhaling the acrid smoke, and he collapsed on the floor of the flight deck. The fire was thought to have also disrupted the oxygen supply to the EROS mask, leaving Lampe with no oxygen to return to the pilot seat and fly the plane. Bell was instructed to land on the airport's runway 12L.

The aircraft was too high on the approach and the gear did not extend. The aircraft passed over the airport before making a tight turn. Bell attempted to turn toward Sharjah International Airport, but mistakenly turned in the wrong direction (195° instead of 095°). Radar contact was lost shortly thereafter at 19:42 UTC. The aircraft finally struck the ground at a shallow angle and at high speed in an unpopulated area between the Emirates Road and Al Ain Highway, barely missing Dubai Silicon Oasis. The right wing hit the ground first and the burning 747 skidded a few meters, exploding in a fireball, killing both Bell and the unconscious Lampe instantly. Many of the initial reports were issued by Emirates pilots living in the area.

== Investigation ==
The United Arab Emirates General Civil Aviation Authority (GCAA) opened an investigation into the crash, assisted by the United States National Transportation Safety Board (NTSB). The Bahraini government conducted its own investigation. UPS also sent its own investigation team. The flight data recorder and cockpit voice recorder were recovered and sent to the United States for analysis by the NTSB.

The GCAA released its final investigation report in July 2013. The report indicated that the fire was caused by the autoignition of the contents of a cargo pallet that contained more than 81,000 lithium batteries and other combustible materials. The shutdown of air conditioning pack 1 for unknown reasons allowed smoke to enter the cockpit.

The investigation also revealed that the cargo liner failed when the fire started, and this contributed to the severity of the damage.

== Aftermath ==
In October 2010, the U.S. Federal Aviation Administration (FAA) issued a safety alert for operators highlighting the fact that the cargo on board Flight 6 contained a large quantity of lithium-type batteries. The FAA issued a restriction on the carrying of lithium batteries in bulk on passenger flights. Boeing announced that the 747-400F fire checklists were to be modified to instruct pilots that at least one of the three air conditioning systems must be left in operation to prevent excessive smoke accumulation on the flight deck.

The accident revived concerns about the effects of smoke in the cockpit, raising the question of whether smoke hoods or inflatable vision units should be introduced in commercial aviation. Around the time of the crash, the US National Transportation Safety Board (NTSB) had asked the FAA to mandate the installation of automatic fire extinguisher systems in the holds of cargo aircraft. UPS Airlines followed FAA regulations, which stated that pilots should depressurize the main cabin and climb to an altitude of at least 20,000 feet (6,100 m) upon detection of a fire so as to deprive the flames of oxygen.

Al-Qaeda in the Arabian Peninsula (AQAP) has claimed responsibility for the crash in addition to the 2010 transatlantic aircraft bomb plot. However, U.S. and United Arab Emirates investigators had said they had not found any evidence of an explosion or terrorist involvement in that incident, and were skeptical about the claim. They suggested it was probably an attempt by AQAP to bolster its image. On September 10, the FBI and the U.S. Department of Homeland Security confirmed that the AQAP was not involved in the crash.

== In popular culture ==
The crash was featured on season 15 of the Canadian documentary series Mayday in an episode titled "Fatal Delivery".
