= Oscillation =

Repetitive variation of some measure about a central value

An undamped spring–mass system is an oscillatory system.

Oscillation is the repetitive or periodic variation, typically in time, of some measure about a central value (often a point of equilibrium) or between two or more different states. Familiar examples of oscillation include a swinging pendulum and alternating current. Oscillations are often used in physics to approximate complex interactions, such as those between atoms.

Oscillations occur not only in mechanical systems but also in dynamic systems in virtually every area of science: for example the beating of the human heart (for circulation), business cycles in economics, predator–prey population cycles in ecology, geothermal geysers in geology, vibration of strings in guitar and other string instruments, periodic firing of nerve cells in the brain, and the periodic swelling of Cepheid variable stars in astronomy. The term vibration is precisely used to describe a mechanical oscillation.

Oscillation, especially rapid oscillation, may be an undesirable phenomenon in process control and control theory (e.g. in sliding mode control), where the aim is convergence to stable state. In these cases it is called chattering or flapping, as in valve chatter, and route flapping.

== Simple harmonic oscillation ==
The simplest mechanical oscillating system is a weight attached to a linear spring subject to only weight and tension. Such a system may be approximated on an air table or ice surface. The system is in an equilibrium state when the spring is static. If the system is displaced from the equilibrium, there is a net restoring force on the mass, tending to bring it back to equilibrium. However, in moving the mass back to the equilibrium position, it has acquired momentum which keeps it moving beyond that position, establishing a new restoring force in the opposite sense. If a constant force such as gravity is added to the system, the point of equilibrium is shifted. The time taken for an oscillation to occur is often referred to as the oscillatory period.

The systems where the restoring force on a body is directly proportional to its displacement, such as the dynamics of the spring-mass system, are described mathematically by the simple harmonic oscillator and the regular periodic motion is known as simple harmonic motion. In the spring-mass system, oscillations occur because, at the static equilibrium displacement, the mass has kinetic energy which is converted into potential energy stored in the spring at the extremes of its path. The spring-mass system illustrates some common features of oscillation, namely the existence of an equilibrium and the presence of a restoring force which grows stronger the further the system deviates from equilibrium.

In the case of the spring-mass system, Hooke's law states that the restoring force of a spring is:
$$F = -kx$$

By using Newton's second law, the differential equation can be derived:
$$\ddot{x} = -\frac km x = -\omega^2 x,$$
where $\omega = \sqrt{k/m}$

The solution to this differential equation produces a sinusoidal position function:
$$x(t) = A \cos (\omega t - \delta)$$

where ω is the frequency of the oscillation, A is the amplitude, and δ is the phase shift of the function. These are determined by the initial conditions of the system. Because cosine oscillates between 1 and −1 infinitely, our spring-mass system would oscillate between the positive and negative amplitude forever without friction.

== Two-dimensional oscillators ==
In two or three dimensions, harmonic oscillators behave similarly to one dimension. The simplest example of this is an isotropic oscillator, where the restoring force is proportional to the displacement from equilibrium with the same restorative constant in all directions.
$$\vec{F} = -k\vec{r}$$

This produces a similar solution, but now there is a different equation for every direction.
$$\begin{align}
x(t) &= A_x \cos(\omega t - \delta _x), \\
y(t) &= A_y \cos(\omega t - \delta_y), \\
& \;\, \vdots
\end{align}$$

=== Anisotropic oscillators ===
With anisotropic oscillators, different directions have different constants of restoring forces. The solution is similar to isotropic oscillators, but there is a different frequency in each direction. Varying the frequencies relative to each other can produce interesting results. For example, if the frequency in one direction is twice that of another, a figure eight pattern is produced. If the ratio of frequencies is irrational, the motion is quasiperiodic. This motion is periodic on each axis, but is not periodic with respect to r, and will never repeat.

== Damped oscillations ==
Phase portrait of damped oscillator, with increasing damping strength

All real-world oscillator systems are thermodynamically irreversible. This means there are dissipative processes such as friction or electrical resistance which continually convert some of the energy stored in the oscillator into heat in the environment. This is called damping. Thus, oscillations tend to decay with time unless there is some net source of energy into the system. The simplest description of this decay process can be illustrated by oscillation decay of the harmonic oscillator.

Damped oscillators are created when a resistive force is introduced, which is dependent on the first derivative of the position, or in this case velocity. The differential equation created by Newton's second law adds in this resistive force with an arbitrary constant b. This example assumes a linear dependence on velocity.
$$m\ddot{x} + b\dot{x} + kx = 0$$

This equation can be rewritten as before:
$$\ddot{x} + 2 \beta \dot{x} + \omega_0^2x = 0,$$
where $2 \beta = \frac b m$.

This produces the general solution:
$$x(t) = e^{- \beta t} \left(C_1e^{\omega _1 t} + C_2 e^{- \omega_1t}\right),$$
where $\omega_1 = \sqrt{\beta^2 - \omega_0^2}$.

The exponential term outside of the parenthesis is the decay function and β is the damping coefficient. There are 3 categories of damped oscillators: under-damped, where β < ω_{0}; over-damped, where β > ω_{0}; and critically damped, where β = ω_{0}.

== Driven oscillations ==
In addition, an oscillating system may be subject to some external force, as when an AC circuit is connected to an outside power source. In this case the oscillation is said to be driven.

The simplest example of this is a spring-mass system with a sinusoidal driving force.
$$\ddot{x} + 2 \beta\dot{x} + \omega_0^2 x = f(t),$$
where $f(t) = f_0 \cos(\omega t + \delta).$

This gives the solution:
$$x(t) = A \cos(\omega t - \delta) + A_{tr} \cos(\omega_1 t - \delta_{tr}),$$
where $A = \sqrt{\frac {f_0^2} {(\omega_0^2 - \omega ^2)^2 + 4 \beta^2 \omega^2}}$ and $\delta = \tan^{-1}\left(\frac {2 \beta \omega} {\omega_0^2 - \omega^2}\right)$

The second term of x(t) is the transient solution to the differential equation. The transient solution can be found by using the initial conditions of the system.

Some systems can be excited by energy transfer from the environment. This transfer typically occurs where systems are embedded in some fluid flow. For example, the phenomenon of flutter in aerodynamics occurs when an arbitrarily small displacement of an aircraft wing (from its equilibrium) results in an increase in the angle of attack of the wing on the air flow and a consequential increase in lift coefficient, leading to a still greater displacement. At sufficiently large displacements, the stiffness of the wing dominates to provide the restoring force that enables an oscillation.

=== Resonance ===
Resonance occurs in a damped driven oscillator when ω = ω_{0}, that is, when the driving frequency is equal to the natural frequency of the system. When this occurs, the denominator of the amplitude is minimized, which maximizes the amplitude of the oscillations.

== Coupled oscillations ==
Two pendulums with the same period fixed on a string act as pair of coupled oscillators. The oscillation alternates between the two.

The harmonic oscillator and the systems it models have a single degree of freedom. More complicated systems have more degrees of freedom, for example, two masses and three springs (each mass being attached to fixed points and to each other). In such cases, the behavior of each variable influences that of the others. This leads to a coupling of the oscillations of the individual degrees of freedom. For example, two pendulum clocks (of identical frequency) mounted on a common wall will tend to synchronise. This phenomenon was first observed by Christiaan Huygens in 1665. The apparent motions of the compound oscillations typically appears very complicated but a more economic, computationally simpler and conceptually deeper description is given by resolving the motion into normal modes.

The simplest form of coupled oscillators is a 3 spring, 2 mass system, where masses and spring constants are the same. This problem begins with deriving Newton's second law for both masses.
$$\begin{cases}
m_1 \ddot{x}_1 = -(k_1 + k_2)x_1 + k_2 x_2 \\
m_2\ddot{x}_2 = k_2 x_1 - (k_2+k_3)x_2
\end{cases}$$

The equations are then generalized into matrix form.
$$F = M\ddot{x} = kx,$$
where
$$M=\begin{bmatrix} m_1 & 0 \\ 0 & m_2 \end{bmatrix}$$,
$$x = \begin{bmatrix} x_1  \\ x_2  \end{bmatrix}$$
, and
$$k = \begin{bmatrix} k_1+k_2 & -k_2 \\ -k_2 & k_2+k_3 \end{bmatrix}$$

The values of k and m can be substituted into the matrices.
$$\begin{align}
m_1=m_2=m ,\;\;    k_1=k_2=k_3=k, \\
M = \begin{bmatrix} m & 0 \\ 0 & m \end{bmatrix}, \;\; k=\begin{bmatrix} 2k & -k \\ -k & 2k \end{bmatrix}
\end{align}$$

These matrices can now be plugged into the general solution.
$$\begin{align}
\left(k-M \omega^2\right) a &= 0 \\
\begin{bmatrix} 2k-m \omega^2 & -k \\ -k & 2k - m \omega^2 \end{bmatrix} &= 0
\end{align}$$

The determinant of this matrix yields a quadratic equation.
$$\begin{align}
&\left(3k-m \omega^2\right)\left(k-m \omega^2\right)= 0 \\
&\omega_1 = \sqrt{\frac km} , \;\; \omega_2 = \sqrt{\frac {3k} m}
\end{align}$$

Depending on the starting point of the masses, this system has 2 possible frequencies (or a combination of the two). If the masses are started with their displacements in the same direction, the frequency is that of a single mass system, because the middle spring is never extended. If the two masses are started in opposite directions, the second, faster frequency is the frequency of the system.

More special cases are the coupled oscillators where energy alternates between two forms of oscillation. Well-known is the Wilberforce pendulum, where the oscillation alternates between the elongation of a vertical spring and the rotation of an object at the end of that spring.

Simulation of a coupled harmonic oscillator with 3 blocks and 5 springs.

Coupled oscillators are a common description of two related, but different phenomena. One case is where both oscillations affect each other mutually, which usually leads to the occurrence of a single, entrained oscillation state, where both oscillate with a compromise frequency. Another case is where one external oscillation affects an internal oscillation, but is not affected by this. In this case the regions of synchronization, known as Arnold Tongues, can lead to highly complex phenomena as for instance chaotic dynamics.

== Small oscillation approximation ==
In physics, a system with a set of conservative forces and an equilibrium point can be approximated as a harmonic oscillator near equilibrium. An example of this is the Lennard-Jones potential, where the potential is given by:
$$U(r) = U_0 \left[ \left(\frac{r_0} r \right)^{12} - \left(\frac{r_0} r \right)^6 \right]$$

The equilibrium points of the function are then found:
$$\begin{align}
\frac{dU}{dr} &= 0 = U_0 \left[-12 r_0^{12} r^{-13} + 6r_0^6r^{-7}\right] \\
\Rightarrow r &\approx r_0
\end{align}$$

The second derivative is then found, and used to be the effective potential constant:
$$\begin{align}
\gamma_\text{eff} &= \left.\frac{d^2U}{dr^2} \right|_{r=r_0} = U_0 \left[ 12(13) r_0^{12} r^{-14} - 6 (7) r_0^6 r^{-8} \right] \\[1ex]
&= \frac{114 U_0}{r^2}
\end{align}$$

The system will undergo oscillations near the equilibrium point. The force that creates these oscillations is derived from the effective potential constant above:
$$F= - \gamma_\text{eff}(r-r_0) = m_\text{eff} \ddot r$$

This differential equation can be re-written in the form of a simple harmonic oscillator:
$$\ddot r + \frac {\gamma_\text{eff}} {m_\text{eff}} (r-r_0) = 0$$

Thus, the frequency of small oscillations is:
$$\omega_0 = \sqrt { \frac {\gamma_\text{eff}} {m_\text{eff}}} = \sqrt {\frac {114 U_0} {r^2 m_\text{eff}}}$$

Or, in general form
$$\omega_0 = \sqrt{\left.\frac {d^2U} {dr^2} \right\vert_{r=r_0}}$$

This approximation can be better understood by looking at the potential curve of the system. By thinking of the potential curve as a hill, in which, if one placed a ball anywhere on the curve, the ball would roll down with the slope of the potential curve. This is true due to the relationship between potential energy and force.
$$\frac {dU} {dt} = - F(r)$$

By thinking of the potential in this way, one will see that at any local minimum there is a "well" in which the ball would roll back and forth (oscillate) between $r_\text{min}$ and $r_\text{max}$. This approximation is also useful for thinking of Kepler orbits.

== Continuous system – waves ==
As the number of degrees of freedom becomes arbitrarily large, a system approaches continuity; examples include a string or the surface of a body of water. Such systems have (in the classical limit) an infinite number of normal modes and their oscillations occur in the form of waves that can characteristically propagate.

== Mathematics ==
Oscillation of a sequence (shown in blue) is the difference between the limit superior and limit inferior of the sequence.

The mathematics of oscillation deals with the quantification of the amount that a sequence or function tends to move between extremes. There are several related notions: oscillation of a sequence of real numbers, oscillation of a real-valued function at a point, and oscillation of a function on an interval (or open set).

== Examples ==
=== Mechanical ===
- Double pendulum
- Foucault pendulum
- Helmholtz resonator
- Oscillations in the Sun (helioseismology), stars (asteroseismology) and Neutron-star oscillations.
- Quantum harmonic oscillator
- Playground swing
- String instruments
- Torsional vibration
- Tuning fork
- Vibrating string
- Wilberforce pendulum
- Lever escapement
- Phugoid oscillation
- Hunting oscillation

=== Electrical ===
- Alternating current
- Armstrong (or Tickler or Meissner) oscillator
- Astable multivibrator
- Blocking oscillator
- Butler oscillator
- Clapp oscillator
- Colpitts oscillator
- Delay-line oscillator
- Electronic oscillator
- Extended interaction oscillator
- Hartley oscillator
- Oscillistor
- Phase-shift oscillator
- Pierce oscillator
- Relaxation oscillator
- RLC circuit
- Royer oscillator
- Vačkář oscillator
- Wien bridge oscillator

=== Electro-mechanical ===
- Crystal oscillator

=== Optical ===
- Laser (oscillation of electromagnetic field with frequency of order 10^{15} Hz)
- Oscillator Toda or self-pulsation (pulsation of output power of laser at frequencies 10^{4} Hz – 10^{6} Hz in the transient regime)
- Quantum oscillator may refer to an optical local oscillator, as well as to a usual model in quantum optics.

=== Biological ===
- Circadian rhythm
- Bacterial Circadian Rhythms
- Circadian oscillator
- Lotka–Volterra equation
- Neural oscillation
- Oscillating gene
- Segmentation clock

=== Human ===
- Neural oscillation
- Insulin release oscillations
- gonadotropin releasing hormone pulsations
- Pilot-induced oscillation
- Voice production

=== Economic and social ===
- Business cycle
- Generation gap
- Malthusian economics
- News cycle

=== Climate and geophysics ===
- Atlantic multidecadal oscillation
- Chandler wobble
- Climate oscillation
- El Niño-Southern Oscillation
- Pacific decadal oscillation
- Quasi-biennial oscillation

=== Astrophysics ===
- Neutron stars
- Cyclic Model

=== Quantum mechanical ===
- Neutral particle oscillation, e.g. neutrino oscillations
- Quantum harmonic oscillator

=== Chemical ===
- Belousov–Zhabotinsky reaction
- Mercury beating heart
- Briggs–Rauscher reaction
- Bray–Liebhafsky reaction

=== Computing ===
- Cellular Automata oscillator

== See also ==
- Antiresonance
- Beat (acoustics)
- BIBO stability
- Critical speed
- Cycle (music)
- Dynamical system
- Earthquake engineering
- Feedback
- Fourier transform for computing periodicity in evenly spaced data
- Frequency
- Hidden oscillation
- Madden–Julian oscillation
- Least-squares spectral analysis for computing periodicity in unevenly spaced data
- Oscillator phase noise
- Periodic function
- Phase noise
- Quasiperiodicity
- Reciprocating motion
- Resonator
- Rhythm
- Seasonality
- Self-oscillation
- Signal generator
- Squegging
- Strange attractor
- Structural stability
- Tuned mass damper
- Vibration
- Vibrator (mechanical)
