= Active-filter tuned oscillator =

Electronic circuit

An active-filter tuned oscillator is an active electronic circuit designed to produce a periodic signal. It consists of a bandpass filter and an active amplifier, such as an OP-AMP or a BJT. The oscillator is commonly tuned to a specific frequency by varying the reactant of the feedback path within the circuit. An example is the Colpitts oscillator.

== Properties ==
An oscillator is any device or system that produces a periodic output. In a tuned oscillator, the period of the output may be controlled by altering the system's resonant frequency. In the case of a tunable electronic oscillator, this is most commonly achieved by altering the circuit's capacitance.

As with all oscillators, active-filter tuned oscillators adhere to the Barkhausen stability criterion, which states that the open-loop gain Aβ must be equal or greater than one, which means magnitude Aβ ≥ 1 and the phase shift around the loop is zero or an integer multiple of 2π: $\angle \beta A = 2 \pi n, n \in \{0, 1, 2,\dots\}\,.$Whenever the criterion is satisfied the circuit starts to oscillate. To make the circuit oscillate at a certain frequency, a frequency selective circuit is made to satisfy the above criterion at a particular frequency. These circuits are called timing circuits of the oscillators.
