= Butler oscillator =

Single transistor emitter-follower circuit

The Butler oscillator is a crystal-controlled oscillator that uses the crystal near its series resonance point. They are used where a simple low-cost circuit is needed which can oscillate at high frequencies (>50MHz) by using overtones of a crystal, and also giving low phase noise.

It was described by Butler in 1946 as the earthed grid oscillator, a derivative of the Hartley oscillator. It is also known as the bridged-T oscillator or the grounded-base oscillator.

== Circuit operation ==
The classic Butler oscillator circuit is a two-stage circuit with two non-inverting stages, a grounded base stage and an emitter follower. The crystal is inserted in series in the overall feedback path.

AC equivalent circuit

The more common modern form of the circuit uses just the emitter follower stage. The circuit may be analysed by considering it as an equivalent AC circuit with three parts. The emitter follower forms an amplifier with no phase shift. The crystal and its loading capacitor then produce a phase lag network, followed by the LC network of the resonant tank circuit. This then produces a phase lead, which overall meets the Barkhausen criteria for self-oscillation.

The Butler circuit is a free-running or tuned oscillator. If the crystal is replaced temporarily with a low value resistor, the circuit will still oscillate at approximately the design frequency of the tank circuit. This allows the circuit to be set-up and adjusted initially without the crystal, and also encourages the selection of the correct crystal harmonic. To avoid the circuit oscillating at the strong resonance of the crystal's fundamental, a small inductor may be placed in parallel with the crystal.

Both the better-known Pierce and Colpitts oscillator circuits may be considered as derivatives of the Butler. (Note: In the sense of circuit analysis, rather than historical origin.)
