= OEO =

OEO may refer to:

- Office of Economic Opportunity
- Optical-electrical-optical conversion of data, often with respect to an optical communications repeater
- Opto-electronic oscillator, a type of photonic oscillator that relies upon a locked laser source
- The Cambodian Orphan and Education Organization
