= Seiler oscillator =

Vacuum tube Seiler oscillator

The Seiler oscillator is an LC electronic oscillator. It was presented in 1941 by E. O. Seiler. The original implementation used a vacuum tube in an Electron-coupled oscillator circuit. Like the Clapp oscillator and the Vackář oscillator it is a variation of the Colpitts oscillator. It uses a voltage divider made of two capacitors, named C3 and C4 in the original schematic. The tuning capacitor C1 is parallel to the inductance L1 of the LC circuit. In an Clapp oscillator, the tuning capacitor is in series to the inductance. The variable capacitor C2 controls the coupling between the tube and tank (LC circuit).

== Practical example ==
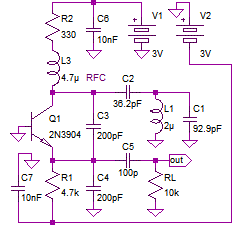
Seiler oscillator with bipolar transistor in base topology practical example

The schematic shows an example with component values. The Seiler oscillator uses a LC circuit L1, C1 that is connected via C2 to a capacitive voltage divider C3, C4 that connects to the amplifier Q1. C1 and C2 are calculated for inductance L1 having a unloaded Q factor of 250. Resistor R1 sets the collector current to 0.5mA with no oscillation. The negative supply voltage V2 allows direct connection from Q1 base to ground. The radio frequency choke L3 is needed to isolate the LC circuit from the power supply, but has a potential problem. L3, C3 and C4 create a Colpitts oscillator circuit. R2 reduces the Q factor of L3 and prevents oscillation on the wrong frequency. The correct oscillator frequency is 10MHz. The load resistor RL is part of the simulation, not part of the circuit.

== Sources ==
- Gottlieb, I. (1997). Practical Oscillator Handbook. Elsevier Science. pp. 182–183. ISBN 978-0-08-053938-6.
