= Heinrich Barkhausen =

German physicist

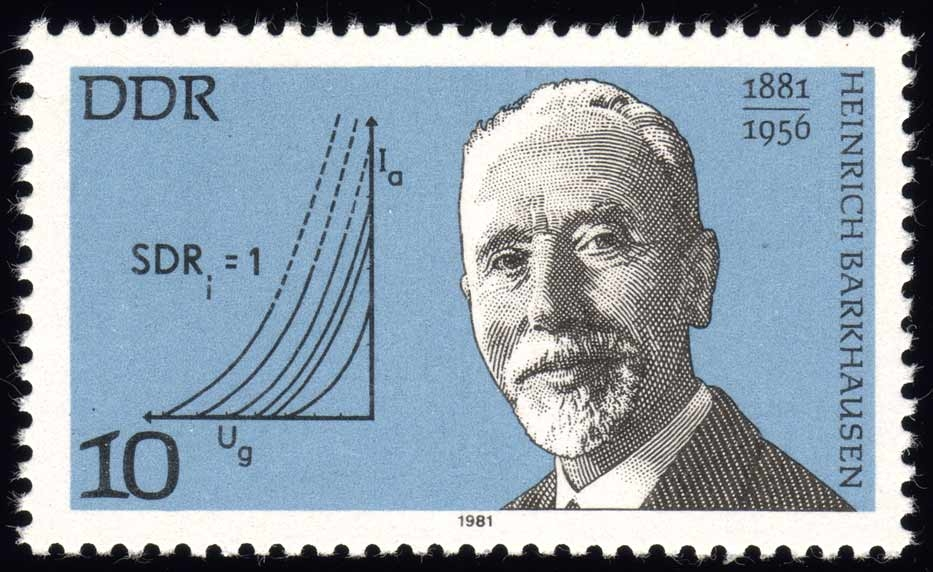
- East German stamp commemorating Barkhausen's centenary (1981)
- Born: 2 December 1881; Bremen, German Empire
- Died: 20 February 1956 (aged 74); Dresden, East Germany
- Education: Technical University of Munich
- Known for: Barkhausen effect Barkhausen stability criterion Barkhausen–Kurz oscillator Loop gain Whistler
- Awards: Morris Liebmann Memorial Prize (1933)
- Scientific career
- Fields: Physics

Heinrich Georg Barkhausen (2 December 1881 – 20 February 1956) was a German physicist who established an influential research laboratory in Dresden. The phenomenon by which ferromagnetic domains align during magnetization and produce discrete acoustic changes due to rotations of the Weiss domains is named after his observations as the magnetic Barkhausen effect. He is also remembered in the Barkhausen criteria for electrical oscillators.

== Life and work ==
Barkhausen was the son of district judge in Bremen. He studied at Bremen Gymnasium and showed interest in natural sciences from an early age. He worked as a railway engineering trainee before going to study at the Technical University of Munich (1901), Technische Universität Berlin (1902), the Ludwig-Maximilians-Universität München (1903) and the Humboldt University of Berlin, and obtained a doctorate at the University of Göttingen in 1907 with a thesis on the generation of oscillations. He then became a researcher in the Berlin laboratory of Siemens and Halske.

He became the first professor of electrical engineering at the Technische Hochschule Dresden in 1911 at the age of 29, thus obtaining the world's first chair in this discipline. He became a significant teacher and conducted influential research. In 1919, he discovered the Barkhausen effect (named after him), which provided evidence for the magnetic domain theory of ferromagnetism. When the magnetic field through a piece of ferromagnetic material like iron is changing, the magnetization of the material changes in a series of tiny discontinuous jumps, which can be heard as a series of clicks in a loudspeaker attached to a coil of wire around the iron. It was later determined that these jumps were caused by the movement of the magnetic domains in the iron, as the domain walls snap past defects in the crystal lattice. The energy lost in these dissipative events is responsible for the shape of the hysteresis curve of iron and other ferromagnets. This effect is widely used in research, and physics education as a simple experiment to demonstrate the reality of magnetic domains. He proposed the use of the phon as a unit of loudness. He also wrote a four volume textbook on electron tubes, Lehrbuch der Elektronenröhren, Elektronenröhren und ihre technischen Anwendungen, which was influential.

In 1920, he invented the Barkhausen–Kurz oscillator, with Karl Kurz, the first vacuum tube electronic oscillator to use electron transit-time effects. It was the first vacuum tube oscillator that could operate at ultrahigh frequency, up to 300 MHz, and inspired later microwave transit-time tubes such as the klystron.

In 1921, he derived the first mathematical conditions for oscillation in electrical circuits, now called the Barkhausen stability criterion. They are widely used today in the design of electronic oscillators and general feedback amplifier circuits.

In 1933 Barkhausen signed the Loyalty Oath of German Professors to Adolf Hitler and the National Socialist State. He received the Morris Liebmann Prize of the same year from the Institute of Radio Engineers. The Institute of High-Frequency and Electron-Tube Technology at Dresden survived through much of World War II until it was bombed on 13 February 1945. He returned to Dresden after the war and was involved in rebuilding the institute. The buildings continue to be called after him as the Barkhausenbau.
