= Delay-line oscillator =

A delay-line oscillator is a form of electronic oscillator that uses a delay line as its principal timing element.

The circuit is set to oscillate by inverting the output of the delay line and feeding that signal back to the input of the delay line with appropriate amplification. The simplest style of delay-line oscillator, when properly designed, will oscillate with period exactly two times the delay period of the delay line. Additional outputs that are correlated in frequency with the main output but vary in phase can be derived by using additional taps from within the delay line.

The delay line may be realized with a physical delay line (such as an LC network or a transmission line). In contrast to a Phase-shift oscillator in which LC components are lumped, the capacitances and inductances are distributed through the length of the delay line. A ring oscillator uses a delay line formed from the gate delay of a cascade of logic gates. The timing of a circuit using a physical delay line is usually much more accurate. It is also easier to get such a circuit to oscillate in the desired mode.

The delay-line oscillator may be allowed to free run or it may be gated for use in asynchronous logic.

Since the optical cavity is a delay line, a laser can be regarded as a special case of the delay-line oscillator.

== See also ==
- Opto-electronic oscillator
