= Quasi-periodic oscillation =

Type of observed X-ray astronomy pattern

In X-ray astronomy, quasi-periodic oscillation (QPO) is the manner in which the X-ray light from an astronomical object flickers about certain frequencies. In these situations, the X-rays are emitted near the inner edge of an accretion disk in which gas swirls onto a compact object such as a white dwarf, neutron star, or black hole.

The QPO phenomenon promises to help astronomers understand the innermost regions of accretion disks and the masses, radii, and spin periods of white dwarfs, neutron stars, and black holes. QPOs could help test Albert Einstein's theory of general relativity which makes predictions that differ most from those of Newtonian gravity when the gravitational force is strongest or when rotation is fastest (when a phenomenon called the Lense–Thirring effect comes into play). However, the various explanations of QPOs remain controversial and the conclusions reached from their study remain provisional.

A QPO is identified by performing a power spectrum of the time series of the X-rays. A constant level of white noise is expected from the random variation of sampling the object's light. Systems that show QPOs sometimes also show nonperiodic noise that appears as a continuous curve in the power spectrum. A periodic pulsation appears in the power spectrum as a peak of power at exactly one frequency (a Dirac delta function given a long enough observation). A QPO, on the other hand, appears as a broader peak, sometimes with a Lorentzian shape.

What sort of variation with time could cause a QPO? For example, the power spectrum of an oscillating shot appears as a continuum of noise together with a QPO. An oscillating shot is a sinusoidal variation that starts suddenly and decays exponentially. A scenario in which oscillating shots cause the observed QPOs could involve "blobs" of gas in orbit around a rotating, weakly magnetized neutron star. Each time a blob comes near a magnetic pole, more gas accretes and the X-rays increase. At the same time, the blob's mass decreases so that the oscillation decays.

Often power spectra are formed from several time intervals and then added together before the QPO can be seen to be statistically significant.

== History ==
QPOs were first identified in white dwarf systems and then in neutron star systems.

At first the neutron star systems found to have QPOs were of a class (Z sources and atoll sources) not known to have pulsations. The spin periods of these neutron stars were unknown as a result. These neutron stars are thought to have relatively low magnetic fields so the gas does not fall mostly onto their magnetic poles, as in accreting pulsars. Because their magnetic fields are so low, the accretion disk can get very close to the neutron star before being disrupted by the magnetic field.

The spectral variability of these neutron stars was seen to correspond to changes in the QPOs. Typical QPO frequencies were found to be between about 1 and 60 Hz. The fastest oscillations were found in a spectral state called the Horizontal Branch, and were thought to be a result of the combined rotation of the matter in the disk and the rotation of the collapsed star (the "beat frequency model"). During the Normal Branch and Flaring Branch, the star was thought to approach its Eddington luminosity at which the force of the radiation could repel the accreting gas. This could give rise to a completely different kind of oscillation.

Observations starting in 1996 with the Rossi X-ray Timing Explorer could detect faster variability, and it was found that neutron stars and black holes emit X-rays that have QPOs with frequencies up to 1000 Hz or so. Often "twin peak" QPOs were found in which two oscillations of roughly the same power appeared at high amplitudes. These higher frequency QPOs may show behavior related to that of the lower frequency QPOs.

== Measuring black holes ==
QPOs can be used to determine the mass of black holes. The technique uses a relationship between black holes and the inner part of their surrounding disks, where gas spirals inward before reaching the event horizon. The hot gas piles up near the black hole and radiates a torrent of X-rays, with an intensity that varies in a pattern that repeats itself over a nearly regular interval. This signal is the QPO. Astronomers have long suspected that a QPO's frequency depends on the black hole's mass. The congestion zone lies close in for small black holes, so the QPO clock ticks quickly. As black holes increase in mass, the congestion zone is pushed farther out, so the QPO clock ticks slower and slower.

== See also ==
- Broad iron K line
- Quasiperiodicity
- Neutron-star oscillation
