= Barkhausen–Kurz tube =

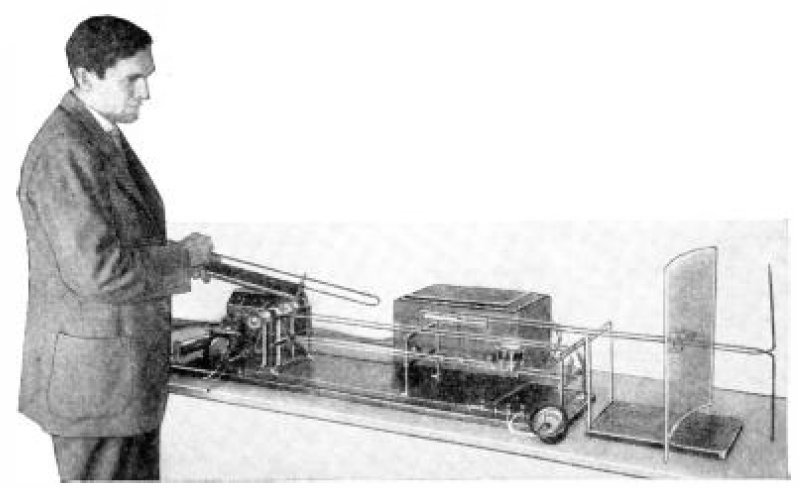
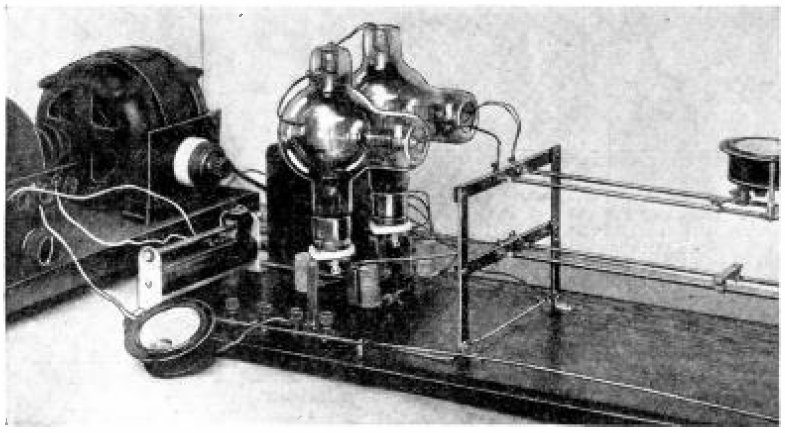
An experimental push-pull Barkhausen oscillator in 1933, which uses Lecher lines (quarter-wave parallel wire transmission line stubs) as the tank circuit. It could generate 5 watts at 400 MHz.

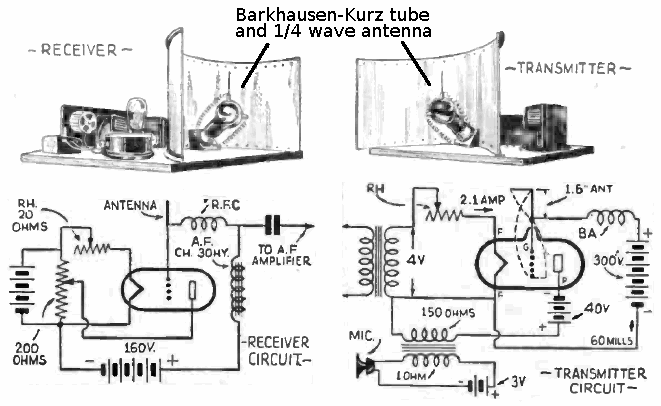
Experimental low power 3 GHz AM communication link from 1938 uses Barkhausen-Kurz tubes for both transmitting and receiving

The Barkhausen–Kurz tube, also called the retarding-field tube, reflex triode, B–K oscillator, and Barkhausen oscillator, was a high frequency vacuum tube electronic oscillator invented in 1920 by German physicists Heinrich Georg Barkhausen and Karl Kurz. It was the first oscillator that could produce radio power in the ultra-high frequency (UHF) portion of the radio spectrum, above 300 MHz. It was also the first oscillator to exploit electron transit time effects. It was used as a source of high frequency radio waves in research laboratories, and in a few UHF radio transmitters through World War 2. Its output power was low, which limited its applications. However it inspired research that led to other more successful transit time tubes such as the klystron, which made the low power Barkhausen-Kurz tube obsolete.

== History ==
The triode vacuum tube developed by Lee de Forest in 1906 was the first device that could amplify, and was used in most radio transmitters and receivers from 1920 on. It was found that the highest frequency at which the triode could be used was limited by the spacing between internal components. Even with the smallest of spacing, the frequency limit of early triodes was in the low megahertz range. A technique called velocity modulation was theorized to overcome this limitation.

In 1920, Heinrich Barkhausen and Karl Kurz at the Technische Hochschule in Dresden, Germany used the velocity modulation theory in developing a "retarded-field" triode. They found it could operate at frequencies into the UHF region, the first vacuum tube to do so. Although severely limited in output power, the Barkhausen–Kurz tube was quickly adopted world-wide for UHF research. This device is also called the retarded-field and positive-grid oscillator. Versions of the Barkhausen oscillator were used in some of the first applications of microwaves, such as the first experimental microwave relay system, a 1.7 GHz link across the English Channel in 1931, and in early radar systems used in World War 2.

The success of the Barkhausen-Kurz tube in generating radio waves at microwave frequencies inspired research to develop similar tubes which did not have its power limitations, resulting in the invention of other tubes which were known as "reflex oscillators". The best known result of this research was the klystron tube invented 1937 by Russell and Sigurd Varian, which is widely used as a high power source of microwaves to the present. Sources like the klystron and magnetron tube replaced the B-K tube around World War 2 and it became obsolete.

== How it works ==
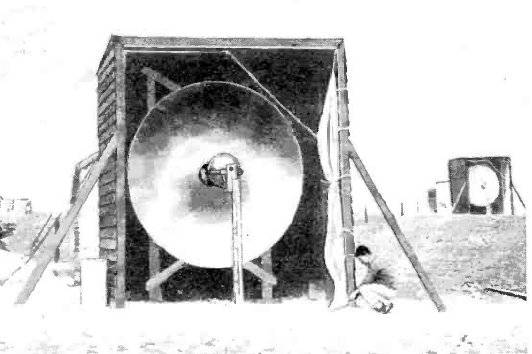
The first experimental microwave relay system, a 1.7 GHz link 40 miles across the English channel in 1931, used a Barkhausen-Kurz tube mounted at the focus of the 10 foot dish shown. It had a radiated power of about 1/2 watt.

The Barkhausen–Kurz tube was a triode operated with the grid (a thin mesh of wires) at a positive potential relative to both the cathode (or filament) and the anode (or plate). The negative electrons emitted from the cathode are accelerated toward the positive grid. Most pass between the grid wires and continue toward the anode plate, but the negative potential on the anode repels them and they reverse direction before they hit the surface of the anode plate and are accelerated back toward the relatively higher potential grid through which they have just passed. Again, most pass through the grid wires, but they are then repelled by the negative potential of the cathode and reverse direction just before reaching the surface of the cathode. The electrons continue oscillating back and forth through the grid until one by one they strike the grid wires.

The oscillating grid potential induced by the passage of the electrons through the grid excites oscillations in a tank circuit attached to the grid, usually consisting of a quarter wavelength of parallel transmission line shorted at the end, called a resonant stub. In turn the oscillating voltage on the tank circuit varies the potential of the grid, causing the electrons to bunch into a cloud of electrons moving back and forth through the grid in phase at the resonant frequency.

The oscillatory motion of the electron cloud continues; this cloud constitutes the alternating output current. Some electrons are lost to the grid on each pass, but the electron supply is continually replenished by new electrons emitted by the cathode. Compared to a conventional triode oscillator, the number of electrons actually hitting the anode plate and grid is small, so the plate and grid alternating currents are small, and the output power of the B-K oscillator is low. Higher power devices like the klystron were later developed to overcome this limitation.

The frequency of oscillation depends on the spacing and potentials of the electrodes, and can be tuned within a limited bandwidth by altering the electrode voltages.
