= Ring oscillator =

Type of digital circuit

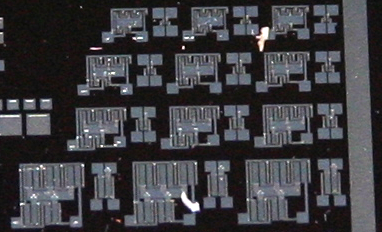
Ring oscillator test structures fabricated on silicon using p-type MOSFETs of different sizes.

A schematic of a simple 3-inverter ring oscillator whose output frequency is 1/(6×inverter delay)

A ring oscillator is a circuit composed of a cascaded chain of inverters (logical NOT gates) arranged in a ring, such that the output of the inverter at the end of the chain is fed back into the first inverter, which produces an output at the output of each inverter that oscillates between two voltage levels representing true and false.

If the inverters used are buffered, then any odd number of inverters can be used. However, if the inverters used are unbuffered, then an odd number of at least 3 inverters must be used. (For simplicity, this article may simply say an "odd number" and ignore this caveat.) This is because a single unbuffered inverter in a loop with itself will simply have its output voltage equal its input voltage. Another formal proof of why a single unbuffered inverter won't work: the phase of the transfer function of a single unbuffered inverter doesn't cross 0° (or any integer multiple of 360°), so it fails to satisfy that necessary condition of Barkhausen stability.

== Details ==
Because a single inverter computes the logical NOT of its input, it can be shown that the last output of a chain of an odd number of inverters is the logical NOT of the first input. The final output is asserted a finite amount of time after the first input is asserted and the feedback of the last output to the input causes oscillation.

A circular chain composed of an even number of inverters cannot be used as a ring oscillator. The last output in this case is the same as the input. However, this configuration of inverter feedback can be used as a storage element and it is the basic building block of static random access memory or SRAM.

The stages of the ring oscillator are often differential stages, that are more immune to external disturbances. This renders available also non-inverting stages. A ring oscillator can be made with a mix of inverting and non-inverting stages, provided the total number of inverting stages is odd. The oscillator period is in all cases equal to twice the sum of the individual delays of all stages.

A ring oscillator only requires power to operate. Above a certain voltage - typically well below the threshold voltage of the MOSFETs used - oscillations begin spontaneously. To increase the frequency of oscillation, two methods are commonly used. First, making the ring from a smaller number of inverters results in a higher frequency of oscillation, with about the same power consumption. Second, the supply voltage may be increased. In circuits where this method can be applied, it reduces the propagation delay through the chain of stages, increasing both the frequency of the oscillation and the current consumed.

== Operation ==
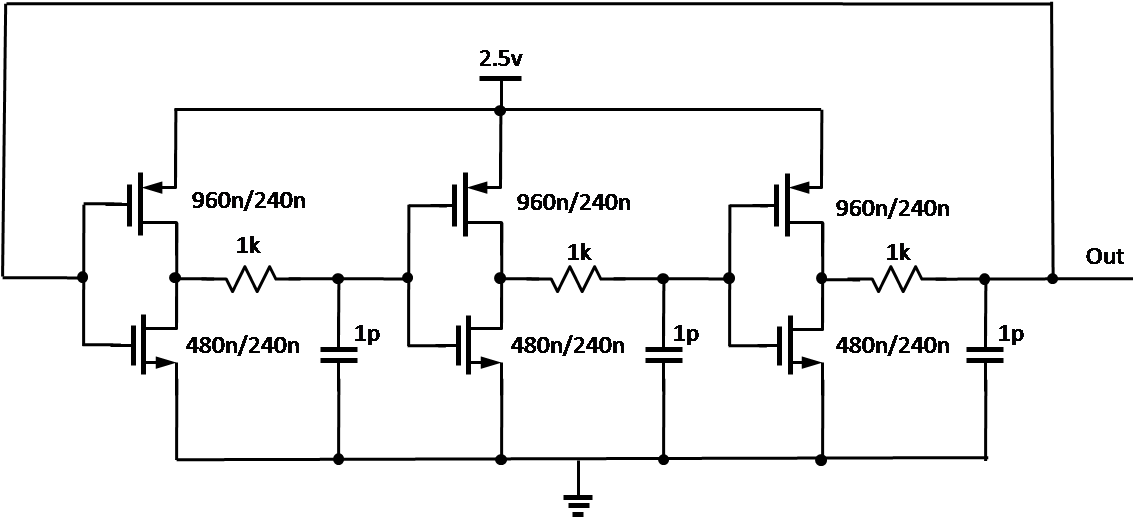
A transistor level schematic of a three-stage ring oscillator with delay in a .25u CMOS process. This particular circuit has high power consumption for its speed, since the inverters run a large current from power to ground when their inputs are at an intermediate voltage. A circuit with current-limiting devices in series with the inverter switches is more energy efficient.

To understand the operation of a ring oscillator, one must first understand gate delay. In a physical device, no gate can switch instantaneously. In a device fabricated with MOSFETs, for example, the gate capacitance must be charged before current can flow between the source and the drain. Thus, the output of every inverter in a ring oscillator changes within a finite amount of time after the input has changed. From here, it can be easily seen that adding more inverters to the chain increases the total gate delay, reducing the frequency of oscillation.

The ring oscillator is a member of the class of time-delay oscillators. A time-delay oscillator consists of an inverting amplifier with a delay element between the amplifier output and its input. The amplifier must have a gain greater than 1 at the intended oscillation frequency. Consider the initial case where the amplifier input and output voltages are momentarily balanced at a stable point. Enhanced-type MOSFET transistors used in CMOS technology are theoretically normally open devices when not biased, but they exhibit high gate sensitivity to electric and magnetic fields when the gate is floating (not biased). Therefore, a small amount of noise from external sources and parallel conduction lines from adjacent circuits can both attract and repel electrons at the gate, causing a rise in conduction level at the amplifier output. After passing through the time-delay element, this small variation in output voltage will be presented at the amplifier input. The amplifier has a negative gain greater than 1; therefore, the output will vary in the direction of the input voltage. The variation will be greater than the input value for a gain greater than 1. This amplified and inverted signal propagates from the output through the time delay and returns to the input, where it is amplified and inverted again. The result of this sequential circuit is a square wave signal at the amplifier output, with the period of each half of the square wave equal to the delay time. The square wave will grow until the amplifier's output voltage reaches its limits, where it will stabilize. A more precise analysis will show that the wave growing from the initial noise may not be square during its growth, but will become square when the amplifier reaches its output limits.

The ring oscillator is a distributed version of the time-delay oscillator. The ring oscillator uses an odd number of inverters to give the effect of a single inverting amplifier with a gain of greater than one. Rather than having a single delay element, each inverter contributes to the delay of the signal around the ring of inverters, hence the name ring oscillator. Adding pairs of inverters to the ring increases the total delay and thereby decreases the oscillator frequency. Changing the supply voltage changes the delay through each inverter, with higher voltages typically decreasing the delay and increasing the oscillator frequency. Vratislav describes some methods of frequency-stability and power consumption improving of the CMOS ring-oscillator.

If t represents the time delay for a single inverter and n represents the number of inverters in the inverter chain, then the frequency of oscillation is given by:

$f = {\frac{1}{2tn} }$.

== Jitter ==
The period of a ring oscillator varies in a random manner as T+T' where T' is a random value. In high-quality circuits, the range of T' is relatively small compared to the average period T. This variation in oscillator period is called jitter.

Local temperature effects cause the period of a ring oscillator to wander above and below the long-term average period. When the local silicon is cold, the propagation delay is slightly shorter, causing the ring oscillator to run at a slightly higher frequency, which eventually raises the local temperature. When the local silicon is hot, the propagation delay is slightly longer, causing the ring oscillator to run at a slightly lower frequency, which eventually lowers the local temperature. So, the frequency of a silicon ring oscillator will generally be stable, when the ambient temperature is constant and factors of heat transfer from the device to the ambient environment do not vary.

== Applications ==
- A ring oscillator is one way to implement an on-chip oscillator, although some kind of relaxation oscillator is another popular implementation.
- The voltage-controlled oscillator in some phase-locked loops is built from a ring oscillator.
- Jitter of ring oscillators is commonly used in hardware random number generators.
- A ring oscillator is sometimes used to demonstrate a new hardware technology, analogous to the way a hello world program is often used to demonstrate a new software technology.
- Many wafers include a ring oscillator as part of the scribe line test structures. They are used during wafer testing to measure the effects of manufacturing process variations.
- Ring oscillators can also be used to measure the effects of voltage and temperature on a chip.

== See also ==
- Bode plot
- Phase margin
- Ring counter
- Cross-coupled LC oscillator
