= Hartley oscillator =

Electronic oscillator

The Hartley oscillator is an electronic oscillator circuit in which the oscillation frequency is determined by a tuned circuit consisting of capacitors and inductors, that is, an LC oscillator. The circuit was invented in 1915 by American engineer Ralph Hartley. The distinguishing feature of the Hartley oscillator is that the tuned circuit consists of a single capacitor in parallel with two inductors in series (or a single tapped inductor), and the feedback signal needed for oscillation is taken from the center connection of the two inductors.

== History ==
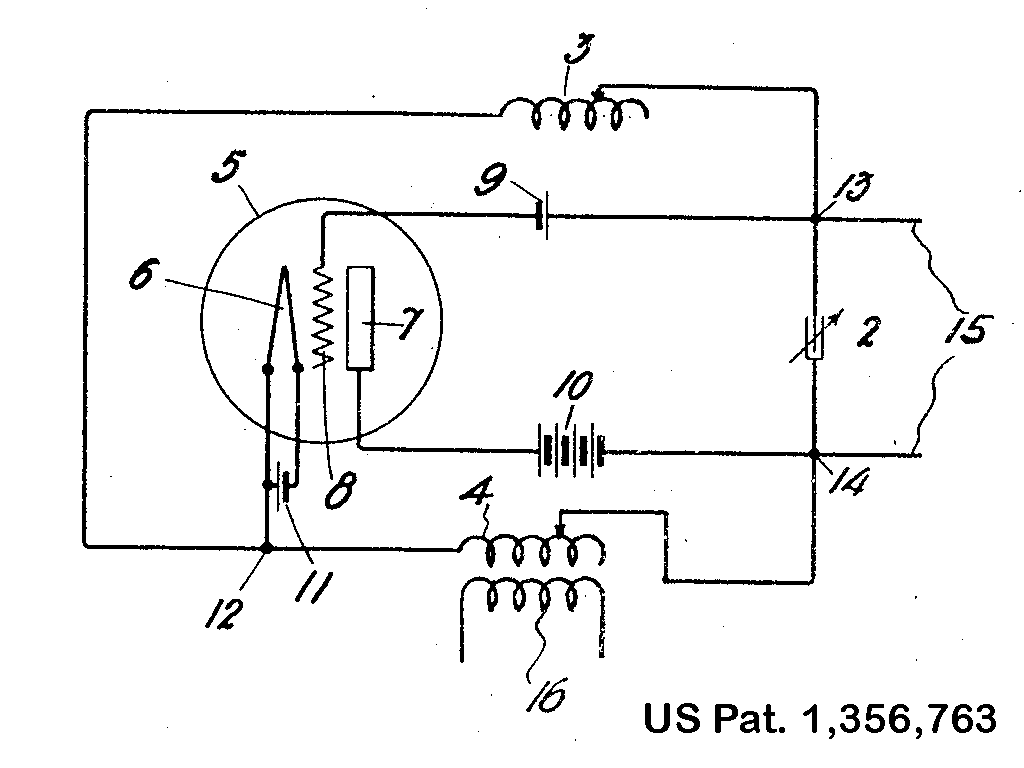
Original 1915 patent drawing used a triode (#5) for amplification with three batteries (#9 for grid biasing, #10 to power the triode, and #11 to heat the cathode) and a variable capacitor (#2) for tuning.

The Hartley oscillator was invented by Hartley while he was working for the Research Laboratory of the Western Electric Company. Hartley invented and patented the design in 1915 while overseeing Bell System's transatlantic radiotelephone tests; it was awarded patent number 1,356,763 on October 26, 1920.

In 1946, Hartley was awarded the Institute of Radio Engineers Medal of Honor "for his early work on oscillating circuits employing triode tubes" and for his work in information theory (which largely paralleled Harry Nyquist) about "the fundamental relationship between the total amount of information which may be transmitted over a transmission system of limited band-width and the time required."

== Operation ==
Hartley oscillator using a common-drain n-channel JFET instead of a tube.

The Hartley oscillator is distinguished by a tank circuit consisting of two series-connected coils (or, often, a tapped coil) in parallel with a capacitor, with an amplifier between the relatively high impedance across the entire LC tank and the relatively low voltage/high current point between the coils. The original 1915 version used a triode as the amplifying device in common cathode configuration, with three batteries, and separate adjustable coils. The simplified common-drain JFET circuit diagram uses an LC tank (here the single winding is tapped) and a single battery, but is otherwise essentially the same as the patent drawing. The circuit illustrates the Hartley oscillator operation:

- the output from the JFET's source (emitter, if a BJT had been used; cathode for a triode) has the same phase as the signal at its gate (or base) and roughly the same voltage as its input (which is the voltage across the entire tank circuit), but the current is amplified, i.e. it is acting as a current buffer or voltage-controlled voltage-source.
- this low impedance output is then fed into the coil tapping, effectively into an autotransformer that will step up the voltage, requiring a relatively high current (compared with that available at the top of the coil).
- with the capacitor-coil resonance, all frequencies other than the tuned frequency will tend to be absorbed (the tank will appear as nearly 0Ω near DC due to the inductor's low reactance at low frequencies, and low again at very high frequencies due to the capacitor); they will also shift the phase of the feedback from the 0° needed for oscillation at all but the tuned frequency.

Variations on the simple circuit often include ways to automatically reduce the amplifier gain to maintain a constant output voltage at a level below overload; the simple circuit above will limit the output voltage due to the gate conducting on positive peaks, effectively damping oscillations but not before significant distortion (spurious harmonics) may result. Changing the tapped coil to two separate coils, as in the original patent schematic, still results in a working oscillator but now that the two coils are not magnetically coupled the inductance, and so frequency, calculation has to be modified (see below), and the explanation of the voltage increase mechanism is more complicated than the autotransformer scenario.

A quite different implementation using a tapped coil in an LC tank feedback arrangement is to employ a common-grid (or common-gate or common-base) amplifier stage, which is still non-inverting but provides voltage gain instead of current gain; the coil tapping is still connected to the cathode (or source or emitter), but this is now the (low impedance) input to the amplifier; the split tank circuit is now dropping the impedance from the relatively high output impedance of the plate (or drain or collector).

Comparison of Hartley and Colpitts oscillator

The Hartley oscillator is the dual of the Colpitts oscillator, which uses two capacitors rather than two inductors for its voltage divider. Although there is no requirement for mutual coupling between the two coil segments, the circuit is usually implemented using a tapped coil, with the feedback taken from the tap, as shown here. The optimal tapping point (or ratio of coil inductances) depends on the amplifying device used, which may be a bipolar junction transistor, FET, triode, or amplifier of almost any type (non-inverting in this case, although variations of the circuit with an earthed centre-point and feedback from an inverting amplifier or the collector/drain of a transistor are also common), but a junction FET (shown) or triode is often employed as a good degree of amplitude stability (and thus distortion reduction) can be achieved with a simple grid leak resistor-capacitor combination in series with the gate or grid (see the Scott circuit below) thanks to diode conduction on signal peaks building up enough negative bias to limit amplification.

The frequency of oscillation is approximately the resonant frequency of the tank circuit. If the capacitance of the tank capacitor is C and the total inductance of the tapped coil is L then

$$f =  {1 \over 2 \pi \sqrt {LC}} \,$$

If two uncoupled coils of inductance L_{1} and L_{2} are used then

$$L = L_1 + L_2 \,$$

However, if the two coils are magnetically coupled the total inductance will be greater because of mutual inductance k

$$L = L_1 + L_2 + k \sqrt{L_1 L_2} \,$$

The actual oscillation frequency will be slightly lower than given above, because of parasitic capacitance in the coil and loading by the transistor.

The Hartley oscillator has several advantages:

- The frequency may be adjusted using a single variable capacitor, one side of which can be earthed
- The output amplitude remains constant over the frequency range
- Either a tapped coil or two fixed inductors are needed, and very few other components
- Easy to create an accurate fixed-frequency crystal oscillator variation by replacing the capacitor with a (parallel-resonant) quartz crystal or replacing the top half of the tank circuit with a crystal and grid-leak resistor (as in the Tri-tet oscillator).

The output is harmonic-rich if taken from the amplifier and not directly from the LC circuit (unless amplitude-stabilisation circuitry is employed). This may be considered an advantage or a disadvantage.

=== Practical example ===
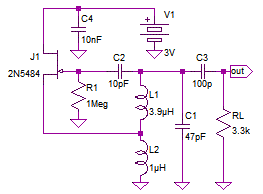
Practical common-drain Hartley oscillator with an oscillation frequency of ~10 MHz

The schematic shows an example with component values. Instead of field-effect transistors, other active components such as bipolar junction transistors or vacuum tubes, capable of producing gain at the desired frequency, could be used.

The common drain amplifier has a high input impedance and a low output impedance. Therefore, the amplifier input is connected to the high impedance top of the LC circuit C1, L1, L2 and the amplifier output is connected to the low impedance tap of the LC circuit. The grid leak C2 and R1 sets the operating point automatically through grid leak bias. A smaller value of C2 gives less harmonic distortion, but requires a larger load resistor. The load resistor RL is part of the simulation, not part of the circuit.

== See also ==
- Opto-electronic oscillator
- Clapp oscillator
- Colpitts oscillator
- Cross-coupled LC oscillator

== Bibliography ==
- Langford-Smith, F. (1952), Radiotron Designer's Handbook (4th ed.), Sydney, Australia: Amalgamated Wireless Valve Company Pty., Ltd.
- Record, F. A.; Stiles, J. L. (June 1943), "An Analytical Demonstration of Hartley Oscillator Action", Proceedings of the IRE, 31 (6): 281–287, doi:10.1109/jrproc.1943.230656, ISSN 0096-8390, S2CID 51643731
- Rohde, Ulrich L.; Poddar, Ajay K.; Böck, Georg (May 2005), The Design of Modern Microwave Oscillators for Wireless Applications: Theory and Optimization, New York, NY: John Wiley & Sons, ISBN 0-471-72342-8
- Vendelin, George; Pavio, Anthony M.; Rohde, Ulrich L. (May 2005), Microwave Circuit Design Using Linear and Nonlinear Techniques, New York, NY: John Wiley & Sons, ISBN 0-471-41479-4
