= Tri-tet oscillator =

A tri-tet oscillator is a crystal-controlled vacuum tube electronic oscillator circuit. It is a type of electron-coupled oscillator (ECO), which uses a tetrode or pentode tube.

The tri-tet was introduced by James J. Lamb in the June 1933 issue of QST magazine.

In an ECO, the screen grid acts as a plate for the triode oscillator. Some of the electrons pass through the screen grid to the plate, causing a current to flow in the load. This effectively isolates the oscillator portion from the load, so that loading does not affect the operating frequency.

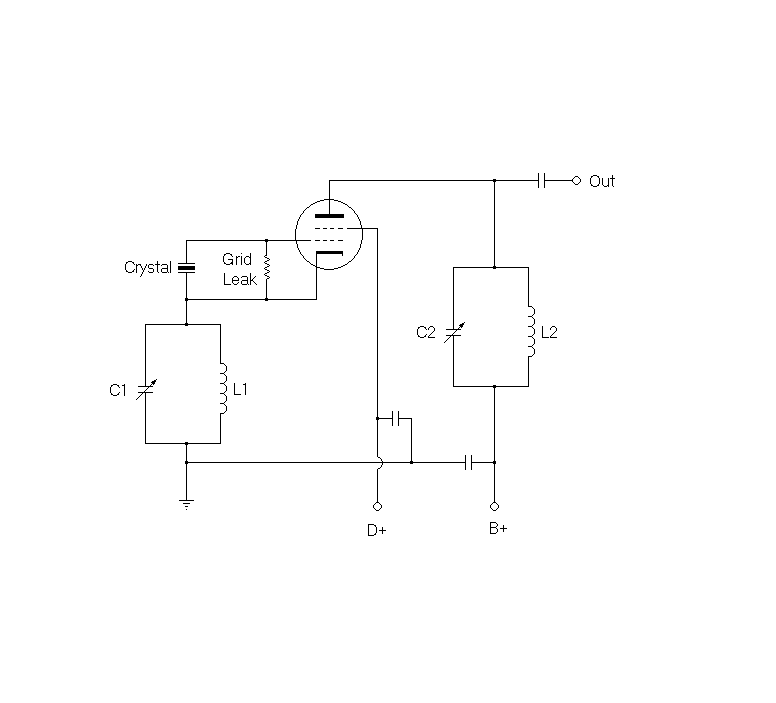
Tri-Tet oscillator schematic

In the schematic shown, the C1/L1 tank circuit control the current through the crystal. It is normally tuned a point between the crystal's fundamental frequency and its first harmonic.

The C2/L2 tank circuit is tuned to the desired harmonic.

D+ acts as the "plate" voltage for the tetrode, and is slightly less than B+.

== Tri-Tet in popular culture ==
Jean Shepherd occasionally mentioned the tri-tet oscillator in his writing and radio shows. It was used as the oscillator in one of the first amateur radio transmitters he used.
