= Vackář oscillator =

Electronic oscillator

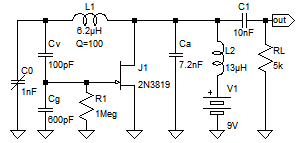
Schematic of what is commonly called the Vackář oscillator. Vackář credited Radioslavia with developing this circuit in 1945.

A Vackář oscillator is a wide range variable frequency oscillator (VFO) which has a near constant output amplitude over its frequency range. It is similar to a Colpitts oscillator or a Clapp oscillator, but those designs do not have a constant output amplitude when tuned.

== Invention ==
In 1949, the Czech engineer Jiří Vackář published a paper on the design of stable variable-frequency oscillators (VFO). The paper discussed many stability issues such as variations with temperature, atmospheric pressure, component aging, and microphonics. For example, Vackář describes making inductors by first heating the wire and then winding the wire on a stable ceramic coil form. The resulting inductor has a temperature coefficient of 6 to 8 parts per million per degree Celsius. Vackář points out that common air variable capacitors have a stability of 2 parts per thousand; to build a VFO with a stability of 50 parts per million requires that the variable capacitor is only 1/40 of the tuning capacity (.002/40 = 50ppm). The stability requirement also implies the variable capacitor may only tune a limited range of 1:1.025. Larger tuning ranges require switching stable fixed capacitors or inductors.

Vackář was interested in high stability designs, so he wanted the highest Q for his circuits. It is possible to make wide range VFOs with stable output amplitude by heavily damping (loading) the tuned circuit, but that tactic substantially reduces the Q and the frequency stability.

Vackář was also concerned with the amplitude variations of the variable-frequency oscillator as it is tuned through its range. Ideally, an oscillator's loop gain will be unity according to the Barkhausen stability criterion. In practice, the loop gain is adjusted to be a little more than one to get the oscillation started; as the amplitude increases, some gain compression then causes the loop gain to average out over a complete cycle to unity. If the VFO frequency is then adjusted, the gain may increase substantially; the result is that more gain compression is needed, and that affects both the output amplitude of the VFO and its frequency stability.

Vackář reviewed several existing circuits for their amplitude stability. In his analysis, Vackář made several assumptions. He assumed the tuned circuit has a constant quality factor (Q) over the VFO's frequency range; this assumption implies that the tank's effective resistance increases linearly with frequency (ω). The Clapp oscillator's transconductance is proportional to ω^{3}. If the Clapp transconductance is set to just oscillate at the lowest frequency, then the oscillator will be overdriven at its highest frequency. If the frequency changed by a factor of 1.5, then the loop gain at the high end would be 3.375 times higher; this higher gain requires significant compression. Vackář concluded that the Clapp oscillator "can only be used for operation on fixed frequencies or at the most over narrow bands (max. about 1:1.2)." In contrast, the Seiler (tapped capacitor) and Lampkin (tapped inductor) oscillators have a transconductance requirement that is proportional to ω^{−1}.

Vackář then describes an oscillator circuit due to Radioslavia in 1945 that maintained "a comparatively constant amplitude over a wide frequency range." Vackář reports that the VFO circuit has been used by the Czechoslovak Post Office since 1946. Vackář analyzes the circuit and explains how to get an approximately constant amplitude response. The circuit's transconductance increases linearly with frequency, but that increase is offset by the tuning inductor's increasing Q. This circuit has become known as the Vackář VFO. Vackář referred to the circuit as "our circuit" and states that O. Landini independently discovered the circuit and published it (without an analysis) in Radio Rivista in 1948. Vackář describes a VFO design using this circuit that covers a modest frequency range of 1:1.17.

Vackář then describes a variation of the Radioslavia circuit that can cover a frequency range of 1:2.5 or even 1:3. This circuit tries to compensate for some variation in Q over the useful range of the VCO. Vackář patented this new circuit and two variations of it.

== Circuit operation ==
The schematic above is the equivalent of Fig. 5 in his paper (Radioslavia design), redrawn for the use of a junction FET. L_{1} and the capacitors form the resonant circuit of a Colpitts oscillator, and capacitors C_{v} and C_{g} also serve as the grid voltage divider. The circuit can be tuned with C_{0}. Example values are from his paper. Resistor R_{L} is part of the simulation, not part of the circuit. L_{2} is a radio frequency choke.

It is similar to an earlier Seiler oscillator; the difference is that in Seiler's, the C_{0} is connected to the other side of C_{a}. Vackář based his design on stability analysis of Gouriet-Clapp (Vackář claims it is for fixed frequency or a very narrow band, max 1:1.2), Seiler and Lampkin oscillators (in the Lampkin's, an inductive voltage divider on the tuned circuit coil is used instead C_{v}, C_{g}, and C_{a} of Seiler's; schematics in the 1st ref).

The oscillator's stability is due largely to the dependency of the tube's (or transistor's) forward transconductance on the resonant frequency (ω) of the tuned circuit. Specifically, Vackář found that forward transconductance varied as ω^{3} for the Clapp oscillator, as 1/ω for the Seiler oscillator, and as ω/Q for his design, where the Q factor of the coil (L_{1}) increases with ω.

The conditions for a forward transconductance that varies minimally with respect to ω are met when:

$C_a \gg C_0 \gg C_v,$ and

$$C_g \gg C_v$$

and the Q of the resonator increases in proportion to ω, which is often approximated by real-world inductors.
