= Opto-electronic oscillator =

Circuit which produces an optical or electronic sine wave signal

Single-loop opto-electronic oscillator. LD is a laser diode. PD is a photodetector.

In optoelectronics, an opto-electronic oscillator (OEO) is a circuit that produces a repetitive electronic sine wave and/or modulated optical continuous wave signals.

An opto-electronic oscillator is based on converting the continuous light energy from a pump laser to radio frequency (RF), microwave or mm-wave signals. The OEO is characterized by having very high quality factor (Q) and stability, as well as other functional characteristics that are not readily achieved with electronic oscillators. Its unique behavior results from the use of electro-optical (E/O) and photonic components, which are generally characterized with high efficiency, high speed, and low dispersion in the microwave frequency regime.

In an OEO, the phase noise of the oscillator does not increase with the frequency that is subject to other implementations by electronic oscillators such as quartz crystal oscillators, dielectric resonators, sapphire resonators or air-dielectric resonators.

== History ==
OEO was introduced in the early 1990s.

Since then, the device's key properties have been continuously improved.

== Operation ==
Most OEOs utilize the transmission characteristics of an optical modulator together with a fiber-optic delay line to convert light energy into stable, spectrally pure RF/microwave reference signals. Light from a laser is introduced into an electro-optic (E/O) modulator, the output of which is passed through a long optical fiber and detected with a photodetector. The output of the photodetector is amplified and filtered and fed back to the electric port of the modulator. This configuration supports self-sustained oscillations, at a frequency determined by the fiber delay length, the bias setting of the modulator, and the band pass characteristics of the filter. It also provides for both electric and optical outputs. The conditions for self-sustained oscillations include coherent addition of partial waves each way around the loop and a loop gain exceeding losses for the circulating waves in the loop. The first condition implies that all signals that differ in phase by some multiple of 2π from the fundamental signal may be sustained. Thus the oscillation frequency is limited only by the characteristic frequency response of the modulator and the setting of the filter, which eliminates all other sustainable oscillations. The second condition implies that, with adequate light input power, self-sustained oscillations may be obtained without the need for the RF/microwave amplifier in the loop.

Chip-scale OEOs utilize whispering gallery mode optical resonators rather than a delay line. Whispering gallery mode optical resonators are axially symmetric dielectric structures ranging in size from tens of micrometers to a few millimeters, and can trap light in a small volume. The modes are solutions of Maxwell's equation and represent waves that propagate close to the surface of the resonator structures, along the perimeter.

== Theory ==
Quality factor (Q) of OEO is determined from a resonator's centre frequency f_{0} and group delay τ

$$Q = { \omega_0 \tau \over 2 } = \pi f_0 { n L \over c_0 },$$

where n is the refractive index, L is the optical fibre length and c_{0} is the speed of light in vacuum.

== Uses ==
A high-performance OEO is a key element in a variety of applications, such as

- modern radar technology,
- aerospace engineering,
- satellite communication links,
- navigation systems,
- precise metrological time and frequency measurements,
- reference clock distribution, and
- high-bitrate, optically supported, communication wireless links, including radio over fiber technology.

== See also ==
- Delay-line oscillator
