= Spectral purity =

Spectral purity is a term used in both optics and signal processing. In optics, it refers to the quantification of the monochromaticity of a given light sample. This is a particularly important parameter in areas like laser operation and time measurement. Spectral purity is easier to achieve in devices that generate visible and ultraviolet light, since higher frequency light results in greater spectral purity.

In signal processing, spectral purity is defined as the inherent stability of a signal, or how clean a spectrum is compared to what it should be.

== See also ==
- Frequency drift
- Frequency deviation
- Jitter
- Automatic frequency control
- Allan variance
