= Phase-shift oscillator =

Electronic circuit with sine-wave output

A phase-shift oscillator is a linear electronic oscillator circuit that produces a sine wave output. It consists of an inverting amplifier element such as a transistor or op amp with its output fed back to its input through a phase-shift network consisting of resistors and capacitors in a ladder network. The feedback network 'shifts' the phase of the amplifier output by 180 degrees at the oscillation frequency to give positive feedback. Phase-shift oscillators are often used at audio frequency as audio oscillators.

The filter produces a phase shift that increases with frequency. It must have a maximum phase shift of more than 180 degrees at high frequencies so the phase shift at the desired oscillation frequency can be 180 degrees. The most common phase-shift network cascades three identical resistor-capacitor stages that produce a phase shift of zero at low frequencies and 270° at high frequencies.

The first integrated circuit was a phase shift oscillator invented by Jack Kilby in 1958.

== Implementations ==
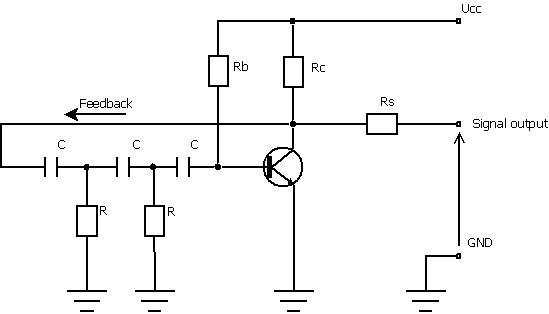
Circuit diagram for phase-shift oscillator using a BJT

=== Bipolar implementation ===
This schematic drawing shows the oscillator using a common-emitter connected bipolar transistor as an amplifier. The two resistors R and three capacitors C form the RC phase-shift network which provides feedback from collector to base of the transistor. Resistor R_{b} provides base bias current. Resistor R_{c} is the collector load resistor for the collector current. Resistor R_{s} isolates the circuit from the external load.

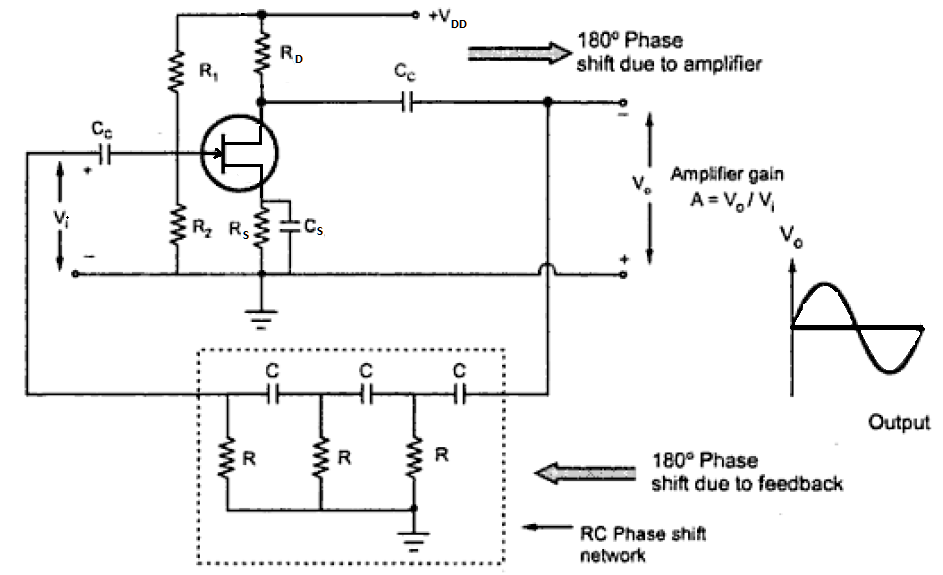
Circuit diagram for phase-shift oscillator using a JFET

=== FET implementation ===
This circuit implements the oscillator with a FET. R_{1}, R_{2}, R_{s}, and C_{s} provide bias for the transistor. Note that the topology used for positive feedback is voltage series feedback.

=== Op-amp implementation ===
Circuit diagram for a phase-shift oscillator using an op-amp

The implementation of the phase-shift oscillator shown in the diagram uses an operational amplifier (op-amp), three capacitors and four resistors.

The circuit's modeling equations for the oscillation frequency and oscillation criterion are complicated because each RC stage loads the preceding ones. Assuming an ideal amplifier, with very low output impedance and very high input impedance, the oscillation frequency is:

$$f_\mathrm{oscillation}=\frac{1}{2\pi\sqrt{R_2R_3(C_1C_2+C_1C_3+C_2C_3)+R_1R_3(C_1C_2+C_1C_3)+R_1R_2C_1C_2}}$$

The feedback resistor required to just sustain oscillation is:

$$\begin{align}
R_\mathrm{fb}= &2(R_1+R_2+R_3) + \frac{2R_1R_3}{R_2} + \frac{C_2R_2+C_2R_3+C_3R_3}{C_1} \\
&+ \frac{2C_1R_1+C_1R_2+C_3R_3}{C_2} + \frac{2C_1R_1+2C_2R_1+C_1R_2+C_2R_2+C_2R_3}{C_3} \\
&+ \frac{C_1R_1^2+C_3R_1R_3}{C_2R_2} + \frac{C_2R_1R_3+C_1R_1^2}{C_3R_2} + \frac{C_1R_1^2+C_1R_1R_2+C_2R_1R_2}{C_3R_3}
\end{align}$$

The equations are simpler when all the resistors (except the negative feedback resistor) have the same value and all the capacitors have the same value. In the diagram, if R_{1}=R_{2}=R_{3}=R and C_{1}=C_{2}=C_{3}=C, then:

$$f_\mathrm{oscillation}=\frac{1}{2\pi RC\sqrt{6}}$$

and the oscillation criterion is:

$$R_\mathrm{fb}=29 \cdot R$$

As with other feedback oscillators, when the power is applied to the circuit, thermal electrical noise in the circuit or the turn-on transient provides an initial signal to start oscillation. In practice, the feedback resistor must be a little bit larger so the oscillation will grow in amplitude rather than remain the same (small) amplitude. If the amplifier were ideal, then amplitude would increase without limit, but in practice amplifiers are nonlinear and their instantaneous gain varies. As the amplitude increases, amplifier saturation will decrease the amplifier's average gain. Consequently, the oscillation amplitude will keep increasing until the average loop gain of the circuit falls to unity; at that point, the amplitude will stabilize.

When the oscillation frequency is high enough to be near the amplifier's cutoff frequency, the amplifier will contribute significant phase shift itself, which will add to the phase shift of the feedback network. Therefore, the circuit will oscillate at a frequency at which the phase shift of the feedback filter is less than 180 degrees.

The single op-amp circuit needs a relatively high gain (about 30) to maintain the oscillation due to the RC sections loading each other. If each RC segment did not affect the others, a gain of about 8 to 10 would be sufficient for oscillation. An isolated version of the oscillator can be made by inserting an op-amp buffer between each RC stage (this also simplifies the modeling equations).
