= Electron-coupled oscillator =

Oscillator used for shortwave superhet radios

ECO oscillator schematic

In the vacuum-tube radio, an electron-coupled oscillator or ECO oscillator uses a screen-grid tube with the cathode, control grid and screen grid forming the elements of the frequency-generating circuit while the plate is in the output circuit, shielded from the oscillator circuit proper by the screen grid. The ECO oscillator is practically impervious to rather drastic variations in its load circuit. The variation in the heater-cathode capacity with temperature changes tends to compensate for other capacity-temperature effects, with the result that the frequency creep during warming-up is less than is usual with the same tubes in more conventional circuits. The ECO oscillator was used for shortwave superhet radios.

== Sources ==
- Gottlieb, I. (1997). "The electron-coupled oscillator". Practical Oscillator Handbook. Elsevier Science. pp. 140–142. ISBN 978-0-08-053938-6.
