= Barkhausen stability criterion =

Condition determining when a linear electronic circuit will oscillate

Block diagram of a feedback oscillator circuit to which the Barkhausen criterion applies. It consists of an amplifying element A whose output v_{o} is fed back into its input v_{f} through a feedback network β(jω).

To find the loop gain, the feedback loop is considered broken at some point and the output v_{o} for a given input v_{i} is calculated: $G = \frac {v_o}{v_i} = \frac{v_f}{v_i}\frac {v_o}{v_f} = \beta A(j \omega)\,$

In electronics, the Barkhausen stability criterion is a mathematical condition to determine when a linear electronic circuit will oscillate. It was put forth in 1921 by German physicist Heinrich Barkhausen (1881–1956). It is widely used in the design of electronic oscillators, and also in the design of general negative feedback circuits such as op amps, to prevent them from oscillating.

== Limitations ==
Barkhausen's criterion applies to linear circuits with a feedback loop. It cannot be applied directly to active elements with negative resistance like tunnel diode oscillators.

The kernel of the criterion is that a complex pole pair must be placed on the imaginary axis of the complex frequency plane if steady state oscillations should take place. In the real world, it is impossible to balance on the imaginary axis; small errors will cause the poles to be either slightly to the right or left, resulting in infinite growth or decreasing to zero, respectively. Thus, in practice a steady-state oscillator is a non-linear circuit; the poles are manipulated to be slightly to the right, and a nonlinearity is introduced that reduces the loop gain when the output is high.

== Criterion ==
It states that if A is the gain of the amplifying element in the circuit and β(jω) is the transfer function of the feedback path, so βA is the loop gain around the feedback loop of the circuit, the circuit will sustain steady-state oscillations only at frequencies for which:

1. The loop gain is equal to unity in absolute magnitude, that is, $|\beta A| = 1\,$ and
2. The phase shift around the loop is zero or an integer multiple of 2π: $\angle \beta A = 2 \pi n, n \in \{0, 1, 2,\dots\}\,.$

Barkhausen's criterion is a necessary condition for oscillation but not a sufficient condition: some circuits satisfy the criterion but do not oscillate. Similarly, the Nyquist stability criterion also indicates instability but is silent about oscillation. Apparently there is not a compact formulation of an oscillation criterion that is both necessary and sufficient.

== Erroneous version ==
Barkhausen's original "formula for self-excitation", intended for determining the oscillation frequencies of the feedback loop, involved an equality sign: |βA| = 1. At the time conditionally-stable nonlinear systems were poorly understood; it was widely believed that this gave the boundary between stability (|βA| < 1) and instability (|βA| ≥ 1), and this erroneous version found its way into the literature. However, sustained oscillations only occur at frequencies for which equality holds.

== See also ==
- Nyquist stability criterion
