= Linear circuit =

Electronic circuits obeying the superposition principle

A linear circuit is an electronic circuit which obeys the superposition principle. This means that the output of the circuit F(x) when a linear combination of signals ax_{1}(t) + bx_{2}(t) is applied to it is equal to the linear combination of the outputs due to the signals x_{1}(t) and x_{2}(t) applied separately:

$$F(ax_1 + bx_2) = aF(x_1) + bF(x_2)\,$$

It is called a linear circuit because the output voltage and current of such a circuit are linear functions of its input voltage and current. This kind of linearity is not the same as that of straight-line graphs.

In the common case of a circuit in which the components' values are constant and don't change with time, an alternate definition of linearity is that when a sinusoidal input voltage or current of frequency f is applied, any steady-state output of the circuit (the current through any component, or the voltage between any two points) is also sinusoidal with frequency f. A linear circuit with constant component values is called linear time-invariant (LTI).

Informally, a linear circuit is one in which the electronic components' values (such as resistance, capacitance, inductance, gain, etc.) do not change with the level of voltage or current in the circuit. Linear circuits are important because they can amplify and process electronic signals without distortion. An example of an electronic device that uses linear circuits is an amplifier.

== Alternate definition ==
The superposition principle, the defining equation of linearity, is equivalent to two properties, additivity and homogeneity, which are sometimes used as an alternate definition

- $F(x_1 + x_2) = F(x_1) + F(x_2)\qquad$ Additivity
- $F(hx) = hF(x)\qquad\qquad\qquad\qquad$ Homogeneity

That is, a linear circuit is a circuit in which (1) the output when a sum of two signals is applied is equal to the sum of the outputs when the two signals are applied separately, and (2) scaling the input signal $x(t)$ by a factor $h$ scales the output signal $F(x(t))$ by the same factor.

== Linear and nonlinear components ==
A linear circuit is one that has no nonlinear electronic components in it. Examples of linear circuits are amplifiers, differentiators, and integrators, linear electronic filters, or any circuit composed exclusively of ideal resistors, capacitors, inductors, op-amps (in the "non-saturated" region), and other "linear" circuit elements.

Some examples of nonlinear electronic components are: diodes, transistors, and iron core inductors and transformers when the core is saturated. Some examples of circuits that operate in a nonlinear way are mixers, modulators, rectifiers, radio receiver detectors and digital logic circuits.

== Significance ==
Linear time-invariant circuits are important because they can process analog signals without introducing intermodulation distortion. This means that separate frequencies in the signal stay separate and do not mix, creating new frequencies (heterodynes).

They are also easier to understand and analyze. Because they obey the superposition principle, linear circuits are governed by linear differential equations, and can be analyzed with powerful mathematical frequency domain techniques, including Fourier analysis and the Laplace transform. These also give an intuitive understanding of the qualitative behavior of the circuit, characterizing it using terms such as gain, phase shift, resonant frequency, bandwidth, Q factor, poles, and zeros. The analysis of a linear circuit can often be done by hand using a scientific calculator.

In contrast, nonlinear circuits usually do not have closed form solutions. They must be analyzed using approximate numerical methods by electronic circuit simulation computer programs such as SPICE, if accurate results are desired. The behavior of such linear circuit elements as resistors, capacitors, and inductors can be specified by a single number (resistance, capacitance, inductance, respectively). In contrast, a nonlinear element's behavior is specified by its detailed transfer function, which may be given by a curved line on a graph. So specifying the characteristics of a nonlinear circuit requires more information than is needed for a linear circuit.

"Linear" circuits and systems form a separate category within electronic manufacturing. Manufacturers of transistors and integrated circuits often divide their product lines into 'linear' and 'digital' lines. "Linear" here means "analog"; the linear line includes integrated circuits designed to process signals linearly, such as op-amps, audio amplifiers, and active filters, as well as a variety of signal processing circuits that implement nonlinear analog functions such as logarithmic amplifiers, analog multipliers, and peak detectors.

== Small signal approximation ==
Nonlinear elements such as transistors tend to behave linearly when small AC signals are applied to them. So in analyzing many circuits where the signal levels are small, for example those in TV and radio receivers, nonlinear elements can be replaced with a linear small-signal model, allowing linear analysis techniques to be used.

Conversely, all circuit elements, even "linear" elements, show nonlinearity as the signal level is increased. If nothing else, the power supply voltage to the circuit usually puts a limit on the magnitude of voltage output from a circuit. Above that limit, the output ceases to scale in magnitude with the input, failing the definition of linearity.

== See also ==
- Network analysis (electrical circuits)
