= Tatsuya Takahashi (engineer) =

Japanese instrument designer (born 1983/84)

Tatsuya Takahashi (born 1983 or 1984) is a Japanese engineer and synthesiser designer. Born in Japan, he studied at the University of Cambridge before joining the Japanese music technology company, Korg. Takahashi has produced several synthesisers with Korg, including the Minilogue and Monotron, as well as the Volca series. After leaving Korg, Takahashi worked with Red Bull Music Academy on several projects before returning to lead Korg's German R&D branch, Korg Berlin.

== Early life and education ==
Takahashi was born in Japan, near Tokyo, and grew up in London. He began soldering at the age of 11, and his first synthesiser project was a square wave oscillator. During his time in secondary school, Takahashi taught himself electrical engineering.

He holds a master's degree in electrical and information sciences from the University of Cambridge. To obtain the degree, Takahashi completed a four-year-long course that culminated in a project on "the distortion behaviour of transistor differential pairs".

== Career ==
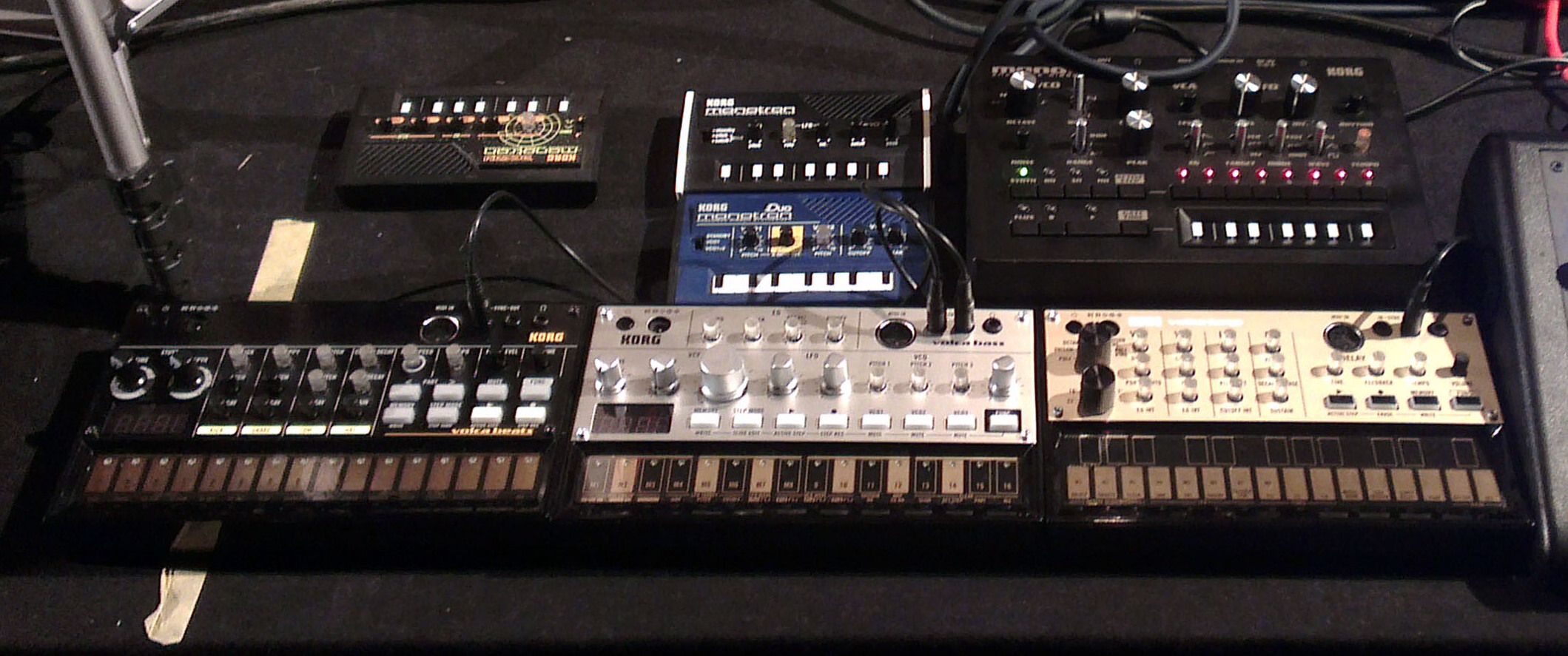
A selection of Korg synthesisers created under Takahashi's lead

A year after leaving university, Takahashi contacted Korg for a job and was granted an interview. He brought one of his inventions—a synthesiser inspired by Christian Marclay—to the interview and was offered a position at the company. Takahashi worked at Korg from 2006 to 2014 and eventually became the company's chief engineer. As Korg's chief engineer, Takahashi was responsible for the creation of the Minilogue, Monologue, Monotribe and Volca synthesisers, as well the reissue of the ARP Odyssey and the MS-20 Mini.

On 16 February 2017, Takahashi announced that he would be leaving his job as Korg's chief engineer. Using Facebook, he stated that he would remain in an advisory role to the company, but move from Tokyo to Cologne.

Takahashi collaborated with Ryoji Ikeda in 2017 for his project, A [For 100 Cars]. For this project, Takahashi created 100 synthesisers designed to output sine waves at different frequencies associated with the musical note A. In 2018, Takahashi worked with Red Bull Music Academy to create a video game based around synthesisers, named Tats. The game gives the player a minute to replicate a sound played using an online synthesiser.

Takahashi returned to work for Korg in 2019, when he joined the company's newly formed German branch. He is the CEO of Korg Berlin, which is focused on research and development.

== Legacy ==
In 2016, Reverb.com put Takahashi on a list of three people they believed are "modern gear visionaries". Alongside Gerhard Behles of Ableton and Cliff Chase of Fractal Audio, the list compared Takahashi to the likes of Robert Moog and Don Buchla, who were early pioneers of the synthesiser.

=== Philosophy ===
Takahashi is a proponent of what he calls the "democratisation of synthesis". He believes that analogue synthesisers should be available to the general public, not just musicians or engineers. This is reflected in the affordable price and mass-production of the analogue synthesisers he produced at Korg. This philosophy has been replicated by other synthesiser manufacturers, such as Roland and Yamaha.
