= Korg Minilogue =

Polyphonic analogue synthesizer

Minilogue
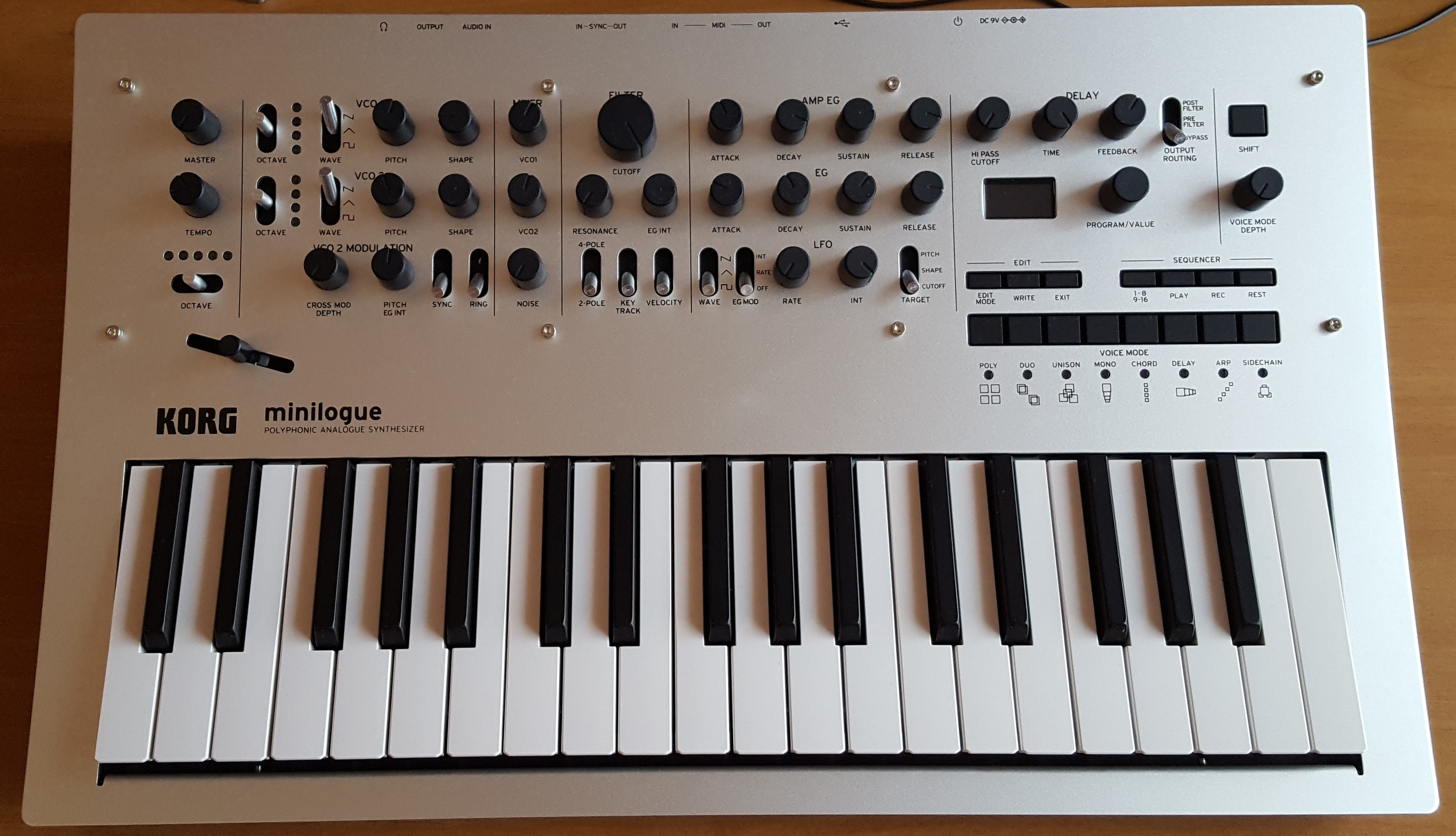
- 2016 Korg Minilogue
- Manufacturer: Korg
- Dates: 2016
- Price: £449 GBP $499.99 US ¥55,000 JPY

Technical specifications
- Polyphony: 4 voices
- Timbrality: Monotimbral
- Oscillator: 2 VCOs per voice
- LFO: 1
- Synthesis type: Analog subtractive
- Filter: 2-pole and 4-pole resonant low-pass
- Attenuator: ADSR envelope (2)
- Aftertouch expression: No
- Velocity expression: Yes
- Storage memory: 200 presets
- Effects: Delay

Input/output
- Keyboard: 37 slim keys
- Left-hand control: Assignable sprung slider
- External control: MIDI In, Out, USB (data only)

The Korg Minilogue is a polyphonic analog synthesizer released in 2016 by Korg. It offers users four-voice polyphony with two analog VCOs per-voice and was designed to be affordable. It was designed by Korg engineer and synthesizer designer Tatsuya Takahashi, who said "the concept of the Minilogue was to build an analog synthesizer that doesn't rely on the fame and success of an old synth".

An updated version, the Minilogue XD was released in 2019, and a limited edition Minilogue Bass was released in 2023.

== Sounds and features ==
The Korg Minilogue combines analog and digital elements in a single-channel, monophonic architecture with four voices. It incorporates a 37-note mini keyboard and an array of modulation and filter settings, alongside a robust sequencer and arpeggiator. Additionally, it is equipped with an OLED screen that functions both as a parameter display and a waveform oscilloscope.

Each of the four voices includes two voltage-controlled oscillators (VCOs) along with white noise, a voltage-controlled filter (VCF), and a voltage-controlled amplifier (VCA), modulated by a digital low-frequency oscillator (LFO) and shaped by dual ADSR envelopes, also digitally generated. The VCOs provide four octave settings and allow selection from three waveforms, with waveshaping capabilities managed manually or through LFO modulation for dynamic effects. The mixed signals from the oscillators and noise generator feed into a switchable 12 dB or 24 dB/octave low-pass filter, featuring adjustable resonance, cutoff modulation via an envelope generator (EG), and three keyboard tracking options. The signal is then directed to the audio VCA, which is modulated by its dedicated ADSR envelope. VCA velocity sensitivity can also be activated via the menu options.

The Minilogue's output combines the four voices in one of eight Voice Modes, including a polyphonic mode for four-voice chords, a unison mode for layered single-note sounds, and an arpeggiator mode. The final audio output includes an analog high-pass filter and a digital delay line, capable of creating a range of effects from reverberant atmospheres to standard delays.

The Minilogue features 200 memory slots—100 are preset factory sounds, and 100 are user-programmable. Each patch can store its sequence, with the capability to record up to four motion sequences that capture changes to panel control values within each program.

== Release ==
Korg announced the Minilogue prior to the 2016 NAMM Show. It was priced new at $499.99 in the United States, ¥55,000 in Japan and £449 in the United Kingdom and Europe. The official release was preceded by leaks which caused media speculation.

In January 2019, Korg release the Minilogue XD, which was shortly followed by a desktop version in May. The XD is an enhanced version of the original Minilogue featuring the same design, four-voice polyphony and control panel while adding the digital Multi Engine from the Korg Prologue, microtunings from the Korg Monologue, an improved filter, and a joystick for parameter control. The desktop version features a poly-chain mode that allows it to be connected to a keyboard-equipped Minilogue XD for eight-voice polyphony.

In 2023, Korg released the Minilogue Bass, a limited-edition version of the original Minilogue with an alternate colour scheme but otherwise the same sound engine.
