= Geoffrey G. Gouriet =

Geoffrey George Gouriet C.B.E., M.I.E.E (9 April 1916 – 16 May 1973) joined the Drive Section of the Transmitters Department of the BBC in 1937, and in 1937/38 he was the inventor of a high stability crystal-controlled variant of the Colpitts oscillator. With the outbreak of war imminent, his circuit was put to immediate use by the BBC to drive its Medium Wave broadcast transmitters, allowing the implementation of Britain's wartime single-frequency synchronised radio services from multiple transmitters. This was a technique adopted to try to prevent the Luftwaffe conducting air raids on British cities using BBC transmitters for navigation.

Due to wartime security measures, Gouriet's oscillator design was kept secret until after World War II. Meanwhile, the same circuit was independently discovered by James Kilton Clapp of the USA, and published by him in 1948. Gouriet's oscillator is usually known as the Clapp oscillator as a result, although newer books use the term Gouriet-Clapp oscillator.

In 1943, Gouriet transferred to the BBC's Research Department, and in 1950 he became Head of the Television Section of the Research Department.

Gouriet presented the Fleming Memorial Lecture for the Royal Television Society twice in February 1954, on the subject of Colour Television.

In August 1964, Gouriet became head of the BBC Research Department, and held the post until 1969.

Gouriet was inaugurated as Chairman of the I.E.E Electronics Division 1964-1965, and his biography was printed in the October 1964 issue of I.E.E Electronics and Power. He was succeeded in this role by Professor Alexander Lamb Cullen for 1965-1966.

In 1972, Gouriet presented the annual Royal Institution Christmas Lectures entitled "Ripples in the ether: the science of radio communication", covering the subjects of Radio and Television broadcasting.

Gouriet died aged 57 in 1973.
