= A (For 100 Cars) =

2017 minimalist composition by Ryoji Ikeda

A [For 100 Cars]
- Minimalist composition by Ryoji Ikeda
- Occasion: Red Bull Music Academy festival
- Performed: 15 October 2017 at 131 South Olive Street, Los Angeles
- Duration: 27–28 minutes
- Scoring: 100 cars, playing sine wave synthesisers

A [For 100 Cars] was a site-specific project created by Ryoji Ikeda. It took the form of a piece of minimalist music, composed in 2017 as part of a Red Bull Music Academy festival held in Los Angeles. The piece is part of Ikeda's series of installations exploring the musical note A and was written for an "orchestra" of 100 cars, which produce sound using sine wave synthesisers created by Tatsuya Takahashi and Maximilian Rest. Each synthesiser was tuned to a different pitch that has been associated with A throughout history, creating beating patterns as the sine waves interacted. During the course of the composition, performers modulated the octave and volume of the sine wave tones according to a score.

A [For 100 Cars] was performed on 15 October 2017 on top of a multi-storey car park opposite the Walt Disney Concert Hall. Approximately 1,000 people attended the performance, which lasted around 27–28 minutes. Journalists had a largely positive reception to A [For 100 Cars], and commented on the unusual nature of the work and the creativity behind it. Mixmag included the piece's performance on their list of the best performances of the festival. As part of the project, local film makers Van Alpert and Estevan Oriol created a short film named LA: Cars + Music to show the influence of music on the car culture of Los Angeles.

== Composition ==
Ryoji Ikeda is a Japanese audiovisual artist and composer. His earliest solo installation is A, which he created out of his curiosity regarding the various frequencies associated with the musical note A. A has been used as tuning standard throughout history but was associated with many different frequencies before being standardised to 440 Hz by the International Organization for Standardization in 1975. Since starting the project in 2000, Ikeda has exhibited several versions of A at various venues, including the Hayward Gallery (A, 2000), Minnesota Street Project (A [4ch version], 2018) and Centre Pompidou (A [continuum], 2018).

Ikeda composed a new version of the project, A [For 100 Cars], as part of the first Red Bull Music Academy (RBMA) festival to be held in Los Angeles. The use of cars in the composition was conceptualised six months prior to its performance during a drinking conversation between Ikeda and the co-founder of the RBMA, Torsten Schmidt. While talking about cars, they considered making an "automobile orchestra" as the next step of Ikeda's A project. Schmidt and Ikeda proposed A [For 100 Cars] after plans were made to take the RMBA festival to Los Angeles in October 2017, citing cars as a "common denominator" between the project and the city. They decided to use synthesisers to create the sounds emitted by the cars. The synthesisers used for the performance at the festival were designed by Tatsuya Takahashi, the synthesiser designer who formerly worked as chief engineer at the Japanese music technology company Korg. The project was the first Takahashi had worked on since leaving Korg. Takahashi partnered with Maximilian Rest of E-RM Erfindungsbüro, a Berlin-based musical instrument maker, to create the synthesisers over a period of around three months.

Ikeda viewed the composition as a collaboration between himself and the car drivers. When asked by LA Weekly, he was reluctant to take credit for the piece, saying:

I wouldn't say this is my piece. It's everybody's piece. I just designed a frame and then it really depends on the participants. The drivers are the performers. Of course they are not trained as musicians, but I want to engage with the local people to make it happen.

=== LA: Cars + Music ===
As part of the project's creation, a short film titled LA: Cars + Music was made by Van Alpert and Estevan Oriol, a Los Angeles-based photographer, in collaboration with the Red Bull Music Academy. The film includes interviews with important groups and figures in Los Angeles' car culture, including Oriol; Bella Doña, a Los Angeles car club; Guadalupe Rosales, a visual artist interested in the city's car culture; Rod Emory, a creator of "Outlaw Porsches" at Emory Motorsports; and Dorian Valenzuela, a former Jet Propulsion Laboratory engineer who refurbishes Alfa Romeos. The film documented the influence of music in the city's car culture; each interviewee was asked what type of music they listen to while driving.

== Music ==
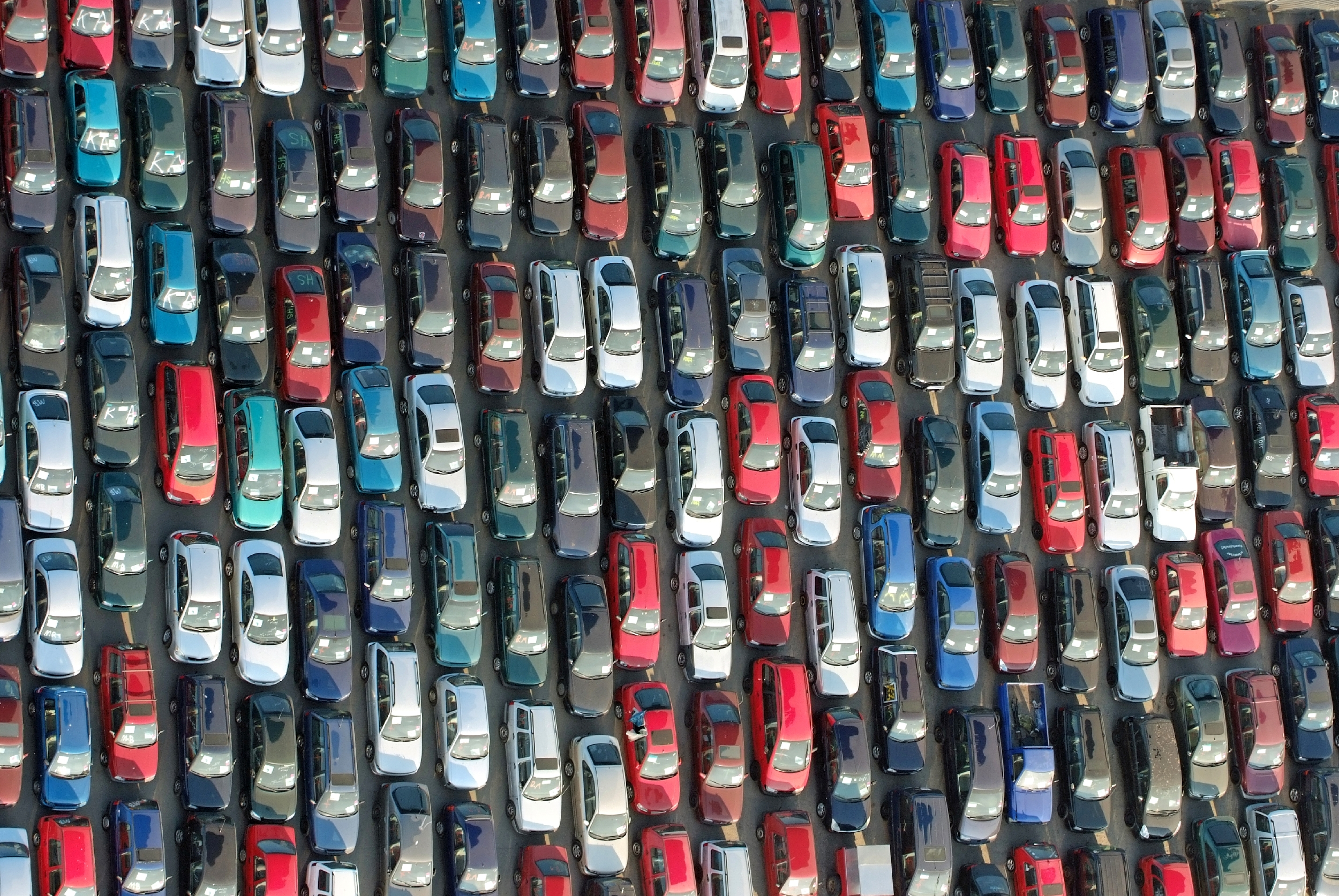
A [For 100 Cars] is scored for a group of 100 cars.

A [For 100 Cars] was performed by a group of 100 cars. This arrangement was called "the world's largest synth orchestra" by Mixmag and Vice. The full performance of the piece lasted for around 27–28 minutes. Each performer was given a coloured score to read which dictated when to play the synthesiser, as well as the volume and octave (from A_{1} to A_{8}).

Each car had a sine wave synthesiser created for the event connected to its sound system, which constantly output a drone at a frequency that has been associated with concert pitch A at some point in history. These frequencies ranged from 376.3 to 506.9 Hz, covering a timespan from 1361 to 1936. The sine waves were generated using the "Magic Circle" algorithm, a digital sinusoid generator which is often used in computer graphics to draw ellipses. The sine waves interfered with each other, creating beat patterns that changed depending on the listener's positioning relative to each sound system. To coordinate the piece, each synthesiser was synchronised together. The synthesisers featured displays for the frequency being output and timing in the performance, as well as knobs for volume and octave. Their design was created from a piece of aluminium, inspired by the Monoliths of Arthur C. Clark's Space Odyssey series and likened to the work of Dieter Rams.

Selected frequencies chosen by Ikeda
Frequency	Source	Audio	Ref(s)
376.3 Hz	Organ of l'Hospice Comtesse (dated c. 1700) in Lille		
419.6 Hz	Organ of Seville Cathedral		
421.6 Hz	Tuning fork of George Frideric Handel		
422.7 Hz	Tuning fork of John Broadwood and Sons, London (17th century)		
427 Hz	Paris Grand Opera (1811)		
430 Hz	Tuning fork of Henry Lemoine (1810)		
437 Hz	Chamber tone of the Italian Opera, Paris (1823)		
457.2 Hz	Tuning fork of Steinway and Sons (1879)		

== Performance ==
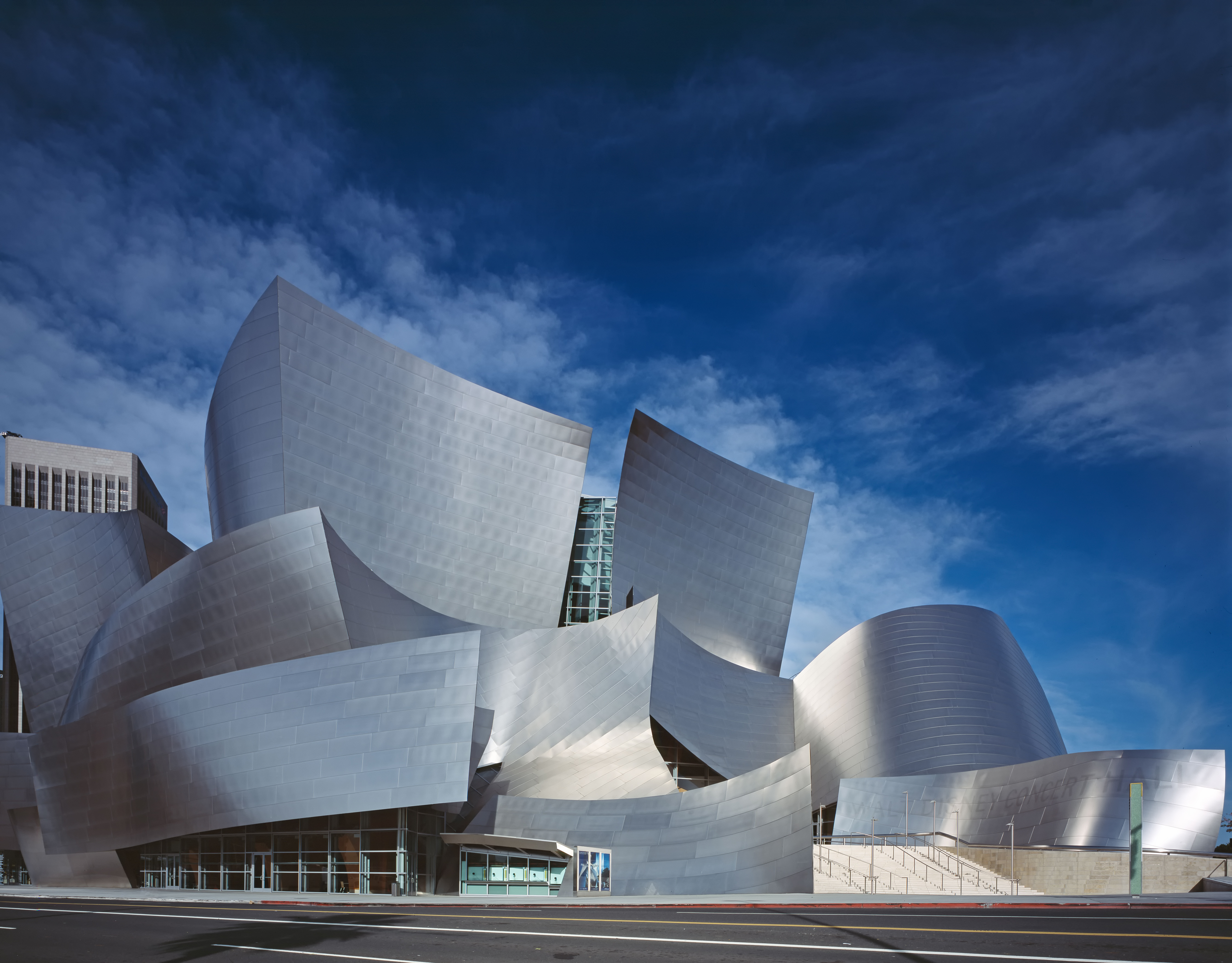
The premiere of A [For 100 Cars] took place opposite the Walt Disney Concert Hall.

As the composition was loud (reaching almost 160 dB), a safety test (using Max, a visual programming language, to create the sine waves) was completed in Cologne before the performance in Los Angeles. To make sure that it was a safe experience for the driver, Ikeda personally took part in the test. In the final performance, all drivers were given a large pair of headphones.

The performance of A [For 100 Cars] took place on 15 October 2017 at a multi-storey car park at 131 South Olive Street, Los Angeles, opposite the Walt Disney Concert Hall. The 100 cars used for the performance were lined up in rows on top of the car park. The performance began at dusk at 6:17 pm in front of an audience of around 1000 people. At the start of the performance, the drivers started their engines and created a grumbling sound by revving them: a sound some likened to an orchestra tuning.

The performers were from Los Angeles and were chosen by Ikeda for their car's modified stereos. Some performers were members of Los Angeles-based car clubs, but no performer was a professional musician. The car's designs were varied and included sedans, SUVs and Los Angeles' signature lowriders. During the performance, some cars used their horns and headlights or had open doors. The performers included some notable residents of the area including Estevan Oriol, who was driving his blue Chevrolet Impala SS.

== Reception ==
On the whole, A [For 100 Cars] was well received by reporters and audiences. It was widely seen as unusual: Selim Bulut of Dazed commented that the sound produced was an "unusual but calming ambient tone". Writing in Vice, Emily Manning suggested an extraterrestrial sound, saying that "the A notes sounded a bit like what you might expect to hear when UFOs land, but more peaceful". In the Los Angeles Times, Randall Roberts commented on the community aspect of the performance and how it "felt like a feat not only of bringing imagination to life". Jon Caramanica wrote in The New York Times that A [For 100 Cars] "turned negative space in the centre of downtown Los Angeles into a sublime womb [and] felt like a meditation". Mixmag put the event on their list of the best performances of the festival, and praised the "depth of thinking and originality behind the piece [which] made it a breathtaking experience for those in attendance". Other listeners were not as impressed. In Autoweek, Mark Vaughn wrote that "most of it sounded, frankly, kind of bland" but conceded that "it was kind of cool to experience".
