= Max Wien =

German physicist (1866–1938)

- Max Karl Werner Wien
- Born: 25 December 1866; Königsberg, Province of Prussia, Kingdom of Prussia
- Died: 22 February 1938 (aged 71); Jena, Gau Thuringia, Nazi Germany
- Education: University of Berlin (Dr. phil.); University of Würzburg (Dr. habil.)
- Known for: Wien bridge (1891)
- Relatives: Wilhelm Wien (cousin)
- Scientific career
- Fields: Physics
- Workplaces: Technische Hochschule Aachen (1898–1904); Technische Hochschule Danzig (1904–11); University of Jena (1911–38)
- Thesis: Über die Messung der Tonstärke (1888)
- Doctoral advisor: Hermann von Helmholtz
- Other academic advisors: August Kundt; Wilhelm Röntgen

Max Karl Werner Wien (German: [ˈmaks ˈviːn]; 25 December 1866 – 22 February 1938) was a German physicist.

== Education and career ==
Max Karl Werner Wien was born on 25 December 1866 in Königsberg (now Kaliningrad, Russia), then located in the Kingdom of Prussia, the son of the co-owner of the well-known Castell grain company, Otto Wien. He was a cousin of physicist and Nobel laureate Wilhelm Wien.

After studying in Königsberg and Freiburg, Wien entered the University of Berlin, where he studied under Hermann von Helmholtz and August Kundt. In 1888, he received his Ph.D. under Helmholtz. In 1892, he worked under Wilhelm Röntgen at the University of Würzburg, where in 1893 he received his habilitation, qualifying him to be a professor.

In 1898, Wien moved to Technische Hochschule Aachen, where he became an extraordinary professor the following year. In 1904, he became a full professor at Technische Hochschule Danzig (now Gdańsk University of Technology). In 1911, he was appointed Director of the Institute of Physics at the University of Jena, a position he held until his death in 1938.

== Research ==
Wien's scientific research were in the areas of high frequency electronics, acoustics, and electrolyte conductance. He is known for the invention of the Wien bridge in 1891, a type of AC measurement circuit similar to the Wheatstone bridge, which was used to measure the impedance of capacitors and inductors. From 1906 to 1909, he did research into the efficiency of early radio transmitters, called spark gap transmitters, which used an electric spark to generate radio waves. In existing transmitters, the spark damped the oscillation in the tuned circuit, creating highly damped waves, in which the radio energy was spread over a wide bandwidth, limiting their range.

In 1906, Wien invented a new type of spark gap, called a "quenched gap", that extinguished the spark immediately after energy had been transferred to the tuned circuit. This transmitter, developed by Telefunken, produced very lightly damped waves, which had a narrower bandwidth and thus greater range, and also produced an easy to identify musical tone in the receiver headphones. Wien "singing spark" or quenched-spark transmitters ("Löschfunkensender") were widely used until the end of the spark era around 1920. He studied the conductance of electrolyte solutions at high fields and high frequencies, discovering what is now called Wien effect.

The Wien bridge oscillator is so named because it uses a Wien bridge as a feedback network, but it was not invented by Wien. William Hewlett, co-founder of Hewlett-Packard, was the first to use a Wien bridge as a feedback network around a vacuum tube amplifier to create an oscillator in 1939.
