= Wien bridge =

Electronic circuit

Wien bridge schematic, U_{we}- sinusoidal power supply voltage, U_{wy}- measured voltage

The Wien bridge is a type of bridge circuit that was developed by Max Wien in 1891. The bridge consists of four resistors and two capacitors.

At the time of the Wien bridge's invention, bridge circuits were a common way of measuring component values by comparing them to known values. Often an unknown component would be put in one arm of a bridge, and then the bridge would be nulled by adjusting the other arms or changing the frequency of the voltage source. See, for example, the Wheatstone bridge.

The Wien bridge is one of many common bridges. Wien's bridge is used for precision measurement of capacitance in terms of resistance and frequency. It was also used to measure audio frequencies.

The Wien bridge does not require equal values of R or C. At some frequency, the reactance of the series R_{2}–C_{2} arm will be an exact multiple of the shunt R_{x}–C_{x} arm. If the two R_{3} and R_{4} arms are adjusted to the same ratio, then the bridge is balanced.

The bridge is balanced when:

$\omega^2 = {1 \over R_x R_2 C_x C_2}$ and ${C_x \over C_2} = {R_4 \over R_3} - {R_2 \over R_x} \, .$

The equations simplify if one chooses R_{2} = R_{x} and C_{2} = C_{x}; the result is R_{4} = 2R_{3}.

In practice, the values of R and C will never be exactly equal, but the equations above show that for fixed values in the 2 and x arms, the bridge will balance at some ω and some ratio of R_{4}/R_{3}.

== See also ==
- Total harmonic distortion analyzer
- Wien bridge oscillator
