= Korg Monologue =

Monophonic analogue synthesizer

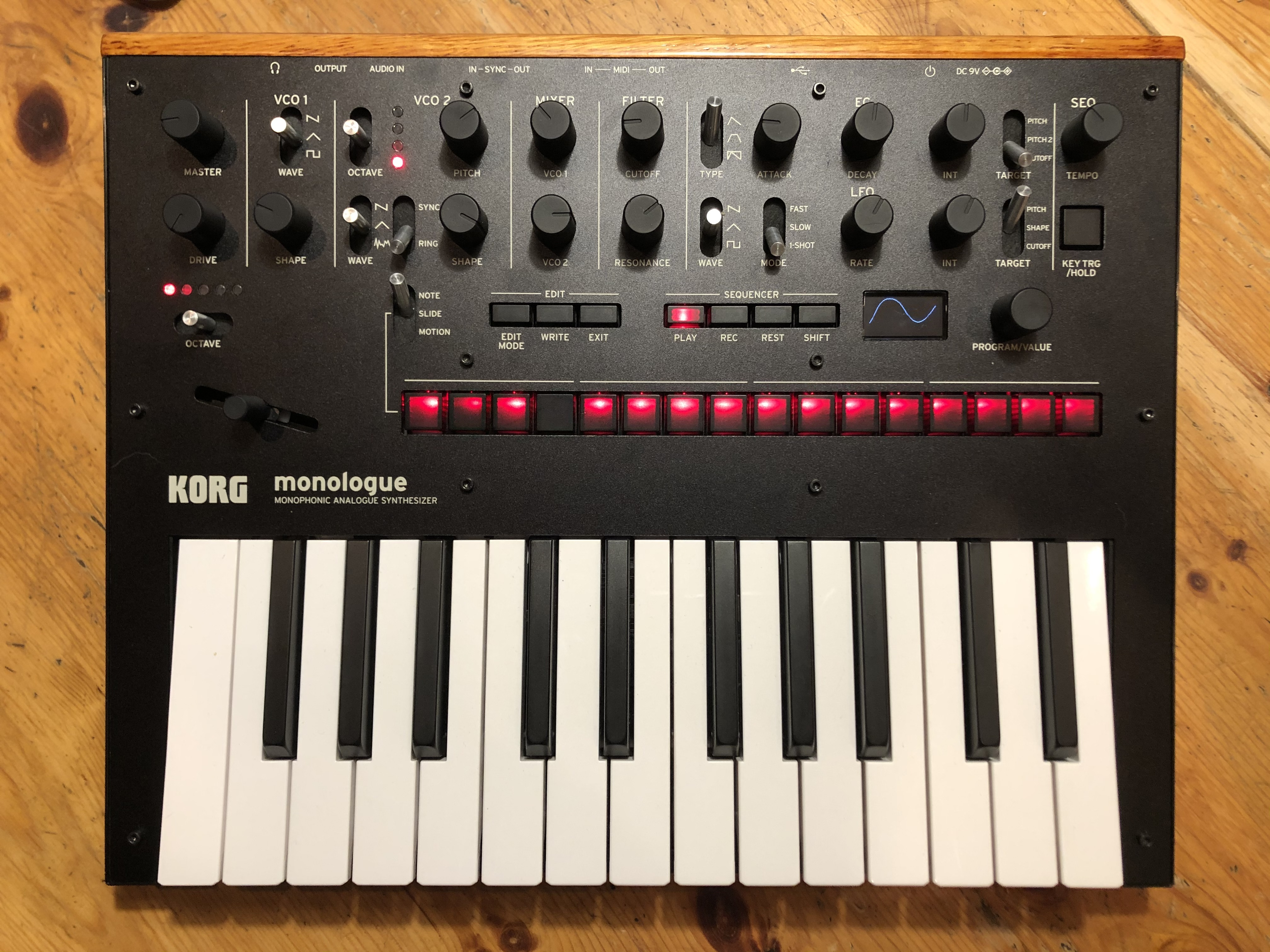
- Manufacturer: Korg
- Dates: 2017
- Price: $299 USD £299 GBP

Technical specifications
- Polyphony: Monophonic
- Timbrality: Monotimbral
- Oscillator: 2
- LFO: Wave (Saw, Triangle, Square), Mode (Fast, Slow, 1-Shot), Rate, Int, Target (Pitch, Shape, Cutoff)
- Synthesis type: Analog synthesis
- Filter: Cutoff, Resonance
- Aftertouch expression: No
- Velocity expression: Yes
- Storage memory: 100
- Effects: Drive

Input/output
- Keyboard: 25 slim keys
- External control: MIDI (In, Out), USB type B

The Korg Monologue is a monophonic analog synthesizer from Korg. Engineered in collaboration with electronic music artist Richard D. James (Aphex Twin), it was released in January 2017 and has two VCOs, 25 keys, and a sequencer.

The Monologue was designed by Korg's then Chief Engineer of Analog Synthesizers, Tatsuya Takahashi, his last design before switching to another position within the company.

It is a trimmed-down, single-voice version of the Korg Minilogue with various characteristics of its own, such as the addition of microtuning, a more aggressive sound due to an added drive knob, fuller low-end frequencies due to a Korg35 MS-20 style filter chip, and an E-E keyboard to make transposition easier for guitarists and bassists.

== Development ==
The Korg Monologue was the last Korg synthesizer that Tatsuya Takahashi worked on directly. He later went on to be an advisor for Korg and currently holds a full-time position at Yadastar GmbH.

According to Richard D. James (Aphex Twin), the Korg Monologue is as of 2017 the only synthesizer on the market to have full microtuning editing. In his interview of Tatsuya Takahashi for Warp Records, Takahashi commented: "It was completely because of you that we included microtuning. If you hadn't insisted on it, I definitely wouldn't have discovered how powerful it was."

Takahashi originally felt that microtuning was a "really niche thing" that would not be needed in a mass market synth, but was soon convinced. "If you try shifting the tuning while running a sequence (in a monophonic synthesizer), you can hear that it gives it another dimension even if it's subtle. To me, it feels like casting light on a rough surface and seeing different patterns as you move the light."

To make Monologue more accessible, the keyboard was built to cover the E–E range of notes, like a guitar or bass.

== Details ==
- Single voice - does not play chords
- 25 keys, E-E range – slim keys
- Two VCOs
- Fully programmable
- 16-step sequencer
- LFO controls
- 100 programs (80 Presets / 20 Users)
- Microtuning – allows creation of own tuning outside of standard scales
- OLED Oscilloscope – for visualising sounds, filter, modulation and drive
- Battery powered and mains powered – no mains power adapter supplied
- MIDI, USB MIDI, and clock I/O and sync – no CV/gate connectivity

Korg worked with Richard D. James as an artist advisor to collaborate on the instrument's presets, sounds and scales.
