= Melville Eastham =

American radio pioneer and business executive

- Born: June 26, 1885; Oregon City, Oregon, US
- Died: May 6, 1964 (aged 78); Cambridge, Massachusetts, US
- Resting place: Portland, Oregon, US
- Awards: IEEE Medal of Honor (1937)
- Scientific career
- Fields: Electrical engineering
- Institutions: General Radio Company

Melville Eastham (June 26, 1885 – May 6, 1964) was a noted American radio pioneer and business executive.

Eastham was born in Oregon City, Oregon. After high school graduation from Portland Academy, he worked as electrician for a Portland street railway, then moved to New York City in 1905 where he worked for the Ovington X-ray Company. After noticing that the high-voltage spark coils used to excite X-ray tubes were becoming popular as transmitters for radio amateurs, he joined two other employees in 1906 to start the Clapp, Eddy, and Eastham Company (subsequently Clapp-Eastham) in Boston, to sell spark coils, variable capacitors, and other radio devices.

In 1915 Eastham left Clapp-Eastham to form the General Radio Company, first located on the third floor of a small flatiron building still standing at the corner of Massachusetts Avenue and Windsor Street in Cambridge, Massachusetts. It provided radio components such as a Precision Variable Air Condenser ($25.00), a Decade Resistance Box ($19.00), a Precision Variable Inductance ($24.00), and an Absorption Wavemeter ($60.00), and quickly profited from strong demand for military radios during World War I and the subsequent radio broadcasting boom. During World War II, Eastham led the LORAN radio navigation development efforts at MIT's Radiation Laboratory. He stepped down as president of General Radio in 1944 but retained the title of chief engineer until his retirement in 1950.

Eastham was named a Fellow of the Institute of Radio Engineers in 1925 and served as its treasurer from 1927 to 1940. He received the IRE Medal of Honor in 1937 "for his pioneer work in the field of radio measurements, his constructive influence on laboratory practice in communication engineering, and his unfailing support of the aims and ideals of the Institute."
