= Voltage-controlled oscillator =

Oscillator with frequency controlled by a voltage input

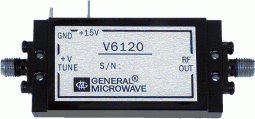
A microwave (12–18 GHz) voltage-controlled oscillator

A voltage-controlled oscillator (VCO) is an electronic oscillator whose oscillation frequency is controlled by a voltage input. The applied input voltage determines the instantaneous oscillation frequency. Consequently, a VCO can be used for frequency modulation (FM) or phase modulation (PM) by applying a modulating signal to the control input. A VCO is also an integral part of a phase-locked loop. VCOs are used in synthesizers to generate a waveform whose pitch can be adjusted by a voltage determined by a musical keyboard or other input.

A voltage-to-frequency converter (VFC) is a VCO that has a very linear transfer function (i.e., the ratio of output frequency to input voltage is nearly constant) over a wide range of input control voltages.

== Types ==
VCOs can be generally categorized into two groups based on the type of waveform produced.

- Linear or harmonic oscillators generate a sinusoidal waveform. Harmonic oscillators in electronics usually consist of a resonator with an amplifier that replaces the resonator losses (to prevent the amplitude from decaying) and isolates the resonator from the output (so the load does not affect the resonator). Some examples of harmonic oscillators are LC oscillators and crystal oscillators.
- Relaxation oscillators can generate a sawtooth or triangular waveform. They are commonly used in integrated circuits (ICs). They can provide a wide range of operational frequencies with a minimal number of external components.

== Frequency control ==
Schematic of an audio-frequency voltage-controlled oscillator

A voltage-controlled capacitor is one method of making an LC oscillator vary its frequency in response to a control voltage. Any reverse-biased semiconductor diode displays a measure of voltage-dependent capacitance and can be used to change the frequency of an oscillator by varying a control voltage applied to the diode. Special-purpose variable-capacitance varactor diodes are available with well-characterized, wide-ranging values of capacitance. A varactor is used to change the capacitance (and hence the frequency) of an LC tank. A varactor can also change the loading on a crystal resonator and pull its resonant frequency.

The same effect occurs with bipolar transistors, as described by Donald E. Thomas at Bell Labs in 1954: with a tank circuit connected to the collector and the modulating audio signal applied between the emitter and the base, a single-transistor FM transmitter is created. Thomas worked with a point-contact transistor, but the effect also works in junction transistors; applications include wireless microphones such as that patented by Raymond A. Litke in 1964.

For low-frequency VCOs, other methods of varying the frequency (such as altering the charging rate of a capacitor by means of a voltage-controlled current source) are used (see function generator).

The frequency of a ring oscillator is controlled by varying either the supply voltage, the current available to each inverter stage, or the capacitive loading on each stage.

=== Phase-domain equations ===
VCOs are used in analog applications such as frequency modulation and frequency-shift keying. The functional relationship between the control voltage and the output frequency for a VCO (especially those used at radio frequency) may not be linear, but over small ranges, the relationship is approximately linear, and linear control theory can be used. A voltage-to-frequency converter (VFC) is a special type of VCO designed to be very linear over a wide range of input voltages.

Modeling for VCOs is often not concerned with the amplitude or shape (sinewave, triangle wave, sawtooth) but rather its instantaneous phase. In effect, the focus is not on the time-domain signal A sin(ωt+θ_{0}) but rather the argument of the sine function (the phase). Consequently, modeling is often done in the phase domain.

The instantaneous frequency of a VCO is often modeled as a linear relationship with its instantaneous control voltage. The output phase of the oscillator is the integral of the instantaneous frequency.

$$\begin{align}
f(t) &= f_0 + K_0 \cdot \ v_\text{in}(t) \\
\theta(t) &= \int_{-\infty}^t f(\tau)\,d\tau \\
\end{align}$$

- $f(t)$ is the instantaneous frequency of the oscillator at time t (not the waveform amplitude)
- $f_0$ is the quiescent frequency of the oscillator (not the waveform amplitude)
- $K_0$ is called the oscillator sensitivity, or gain. Its units are hertz per volt.
- $f(\tau)$ is the VCO's frequency
- $\theta(t)$ is the VCO's output phase
- $v_\text{in}(t)$ is the time-domain control input or tuning voltage of the VCO

For analyzing a control system, the Laplace transforms of the above signals are useful.

$$\begin{align}
F(s) &= K_0 \cdot \ V_\text{in}(s) \\
\Theta(s) &= {F(s) \over s} \\
\end{align}$$

== Design and circuits ==
Tuning range, tuning gain and phase noise are the important characteristics of a VCO. Generally, low phase noise is preferred in a VCO. Tuning gain and noise present in the control signal affect the phase noise; high noise or high tuning gain implies more phase noise. Other important elements that determine the phase noise are sources of flicker noise (1/f noise) in the circuit, the output power level, and the loaded Q factor of the resonator. (see Leeson's equation). The low-frequency flicker noise affects the phase noise because the flicker noise is heterodyned to the oscillator output frequency due to the non-linear transfer function of active devices. The effect of flicker noise can be reduced with negative feedback that linearizes the transfer function (for example, emitter degeneration).

VCOs generally have a lower Q factor compared to similar fixed-frequency oscillators, and so suffer more jitter. The jitter can be made low enough for many applications (such as driving an ASIC), in which case VCOs enjoy the advantages of having no off-chip components (expensive) or on-chip inductors (low yields on generic CMOS processes).

=== LC oscillators ===
Commonly used VCO circuits are the Clapp and Colpitts oscillators. The more widely used oscillator of the two is Colpitts and these oscillators are very similar in configuration. In integrated radio transmitters and receivers, cross-coupled LC oscillators are widely used due to their differential output signal, which offers advantages over traditional single-ended topologies such as Clapp and Colpitts oscillators.

=== Crystal oscillators ===
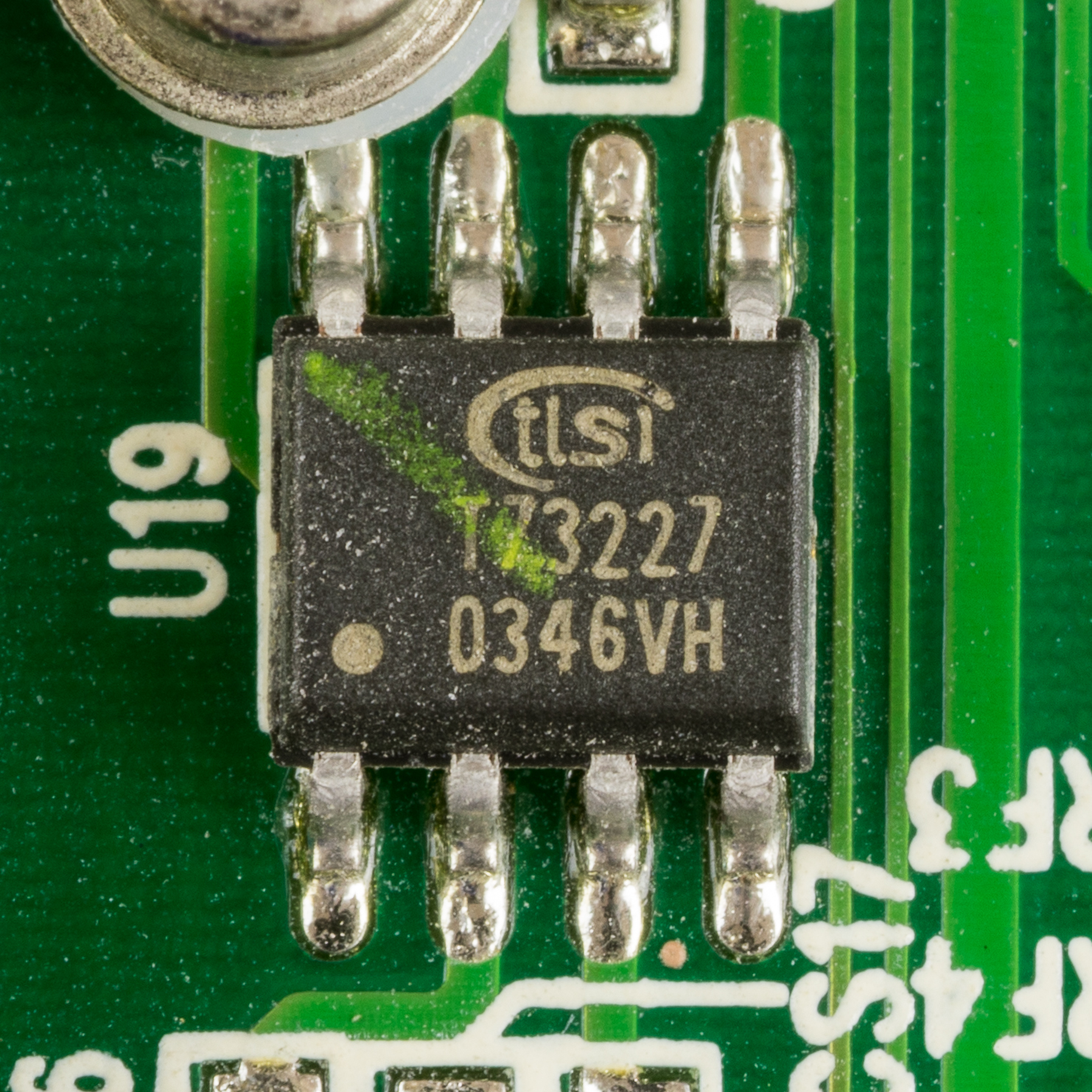
27 MHz VCXO clock generator IC (TLSI T73227), used in a DVB-T set-top box.

A voltage-controlled crystal oscillator (VCXO) is used for fine adjustment of the operating frequency. The frequency of a voltage-controlled crystal oscillator can be varied a few tens of parts per million (ppm) over a control voltage range of typically 0 to 3 volts, because the high Q factor of the crystals allows frequency control over only a small range of frequencies.

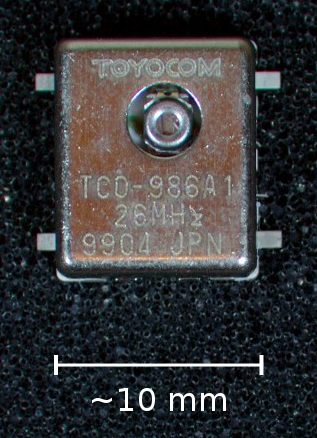
A 26 MHz TCVCXO

A temperature-compensated VCXO (TCVCXO) incorporates components that partially correct the dependence on temperature of the resonant frequency of the crystal. A smaller range of voltage control then suffices to stabilize the oscillator frequency in applications where temperature varies, such as heat buildup inside a transmitter.

Placing the oscillator in a crystal oven at a constant but higher-than-ambient temperature is another way to stabilize oscillator frequency. High-stability crystal oscillator references often place the crystal in an oven and use a voltage input for fine control. The temperature is selected to be the turnover temperature: the temperature where small changes do not affect the resonance. The control voltage can be used to occasionally adjust the reference frequency to a NIST source. Sophisticated designs may also adjust the control voltage over time to compensate for crystal aging.

=== Clock generators ===
A clock generator is an oscillator that provides a timing signal to synchronize operations in digital circuits. VCXO clock generators are used in many areas such as digital TV, modems, transmitters and computers. Design parameters for a VCXO clock generator are tuning voltage range, center frequency, frequency tuning range and the timing jitter of the output signal. Jitter is a form of phase noise that must be minimised in applications such as radio receivers, transmitters and measuring equipment.

When a wider selection of clock frequencies is needed, the VCXO output can be passed through digital divider circuits to obtain lower frequencies or be fed to a phase-locked loop (PLL). ICs containing both a VCXO (for external crystal) and a PLL are available. A typical application is to provide clock frequencies in a range from 12 to 96 kHz to an audio digital-to-analog converter.

=== Frequency synthesizers ===
A frequency synthesizer generates precise and adjustable frequencies based on a stable single-frequency clock. A digitally controlled oscillator based on a frequency synthesizer may serve as a digital alternative to analog voltage-controlled oscillator circuits.

== Applications ==
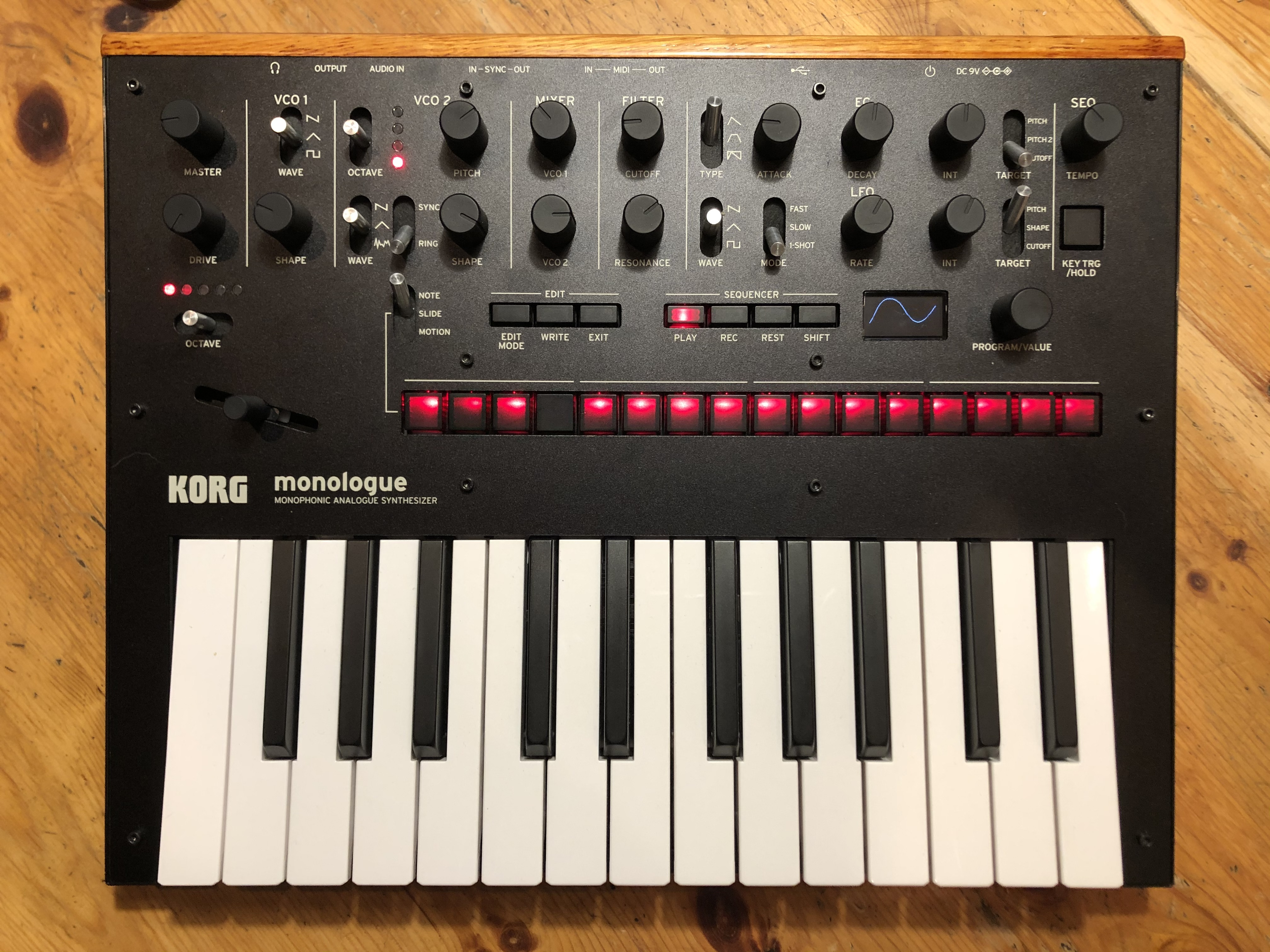
The Korg Monologue is a monophonic synthesizer with two VCOs.

VCOs are used in function generators, phase-locked loops, including frequency synthesizers used in communication equipment and the production of electronic music, to generate variable tones in synthesizers.

Function generators are low-frequency oscillators that feature multiple waveforms, typically sine, square, and triangle waves. Monolithic function generators are voltage-controlled.

Analog phase-locked loops typically contain VCOs. High-frequency VCOs are usually used in phase-locked loops for radio receivers. Phase noise is the most important specification in this application.

Audio-frequency VCOs are used in analog music synthesizers. For these, sweep range, linearity, and distortion are often the most important specifications. Audio-frequency VCOs for use in musical contexts were largely superseded in the 1980s by their digital counterparts, digitally controlled oscillators (DCOs), due to their output stability in the face of temperature changes during operation. Since the 1990s, musical software has become the dominant sound-generating method.

Voltage-to-frequency converters are voltage-controlled oscillators with a highly linear relation between applied voltage and frequency. They are used to convert a slow analog signal (such as from a temperature transducer) to a signal suitable for transmission over a long distance. Oscillators in this application may have sine or square wave outputs.

Where the oscillator drives equipment that may generate radio-frequency interference, adding a varying voltage to its control input, called dithering, can disperse the interference spectrum to make it less objectionable (see spread-spectrum clock).

== See also ==
- Low-frequency oscillation (LFO)
- Modular synthesizer
- Numerically-controlled oscillator (NCO)
- Variable-frequency oscillator (VFO)
- Variable-gain amplifier
- Voltage-controlled filter (VCF)
