= James Kilton Clapp =

American electrical engineer

James Kilton Clapp (December 30, 1897 – 1965) was an American electrical engineer who worked for General Radio Corporation. He was born in Denver, Colorado and graduated from Massachusetts Institute of Technology in 1923, obtaining a master's degree there in 1926. He taught at MIT and then joined General Radio Corporation in 1928, until his retirement in 1957. He became a member of the IRE in 1928 and in 1933 was named "Fellow".

Several of Clapp's inventions became the basis of General Radio products. He invented a quartz-crystal oscillator frequency standard in 1930, and patented a temperature control oven for crystal oscillators. Clapp's name is best known in the field of electronics for his description in 1948 of an improved form of Colpitts oscillator known as the Clapp oscillator.
