= General Radio =

United States Electronic test equipment manufacturer

General Radio Company
- GenRad logo from 2000
- Company type: Public
- Traded as: NYSE: GEN
- Industry: Automatic test equipment; Electronic test equipment
- Founded: June 14, 1915; 110 years ago in Cambridge, Massachusetts, US
- Founder: Melville Eastham
- Defunct: October 27, 2001
- Fate: Merger
- Successors: IET Labs; Teradyne
- Headquarters: West Concord, Massachusetts
- Key people: James Kilton Clapp
- Number of employees: 1,524 (2001)
- Website: genrad.com at the Wayback Machine (archived 29 February 2000)

General Radio Company (later, GenRad) was a broad-line manufacturer of electronic test equipment in Massachusetts, U.S. from 1915 to 2001. During the middle of 20th century, they were a major competitor to Hewlett-Packard and Tektronix.

== History ==
On June 14, 1915, Melville Eastham and a small group of investors started General Radio Company in Cambridge, Massachusetts, a few blocks northwest of Massachusetts Institute of Technology. During the 1950s, the company moved to West Concord, Massachusetts, where it became a major player in the automatic test equipment (ATE) business, manufacturing a line of testers for assembled printed circuit boards. It also produced extensive lines of electrical component measuring equipment, sound and vibration measurement and RLC standards. In 1975, the company name was changed to GenRad.

In 1991, a startup QuadTech was founded as spinoff of GenRad's Instrumentation division and Precision Product lines, as well as the rights to use the "GenRad" and "General Radio" names. In 2000, IET Labs acquired from QuadTech the GenRad RLC standards, impedance decades, megohmmeters, digibridges, audio lines, stroboscope lines. Then in 2005 IET Labs purchased the Digibridge and Megohmmeter lines, which continue to be manufactured in West Roxbury, Massachusetts. In 2001, Teradyne acquired the GenRad board test system lines, which were relocated to Teradyne's corporate campus in North Reading, Massachusetts.

Among General Radio's accomplishments over the years have been:

- The introduction of one of the world's first portable oscilloscopes.
- The production of many high-precision standards for inductance, resistance, and capacitance.
- The production of the stroboscope as the Strobotac.
- The production of the sound level meter.
- The Variac variable autotransformer, which was a U.S. trademark of General Radio from 1934 to 2001.
- Invention of the "five-way" binding post connector.
- Invention of the GR connector.

== Gallery ==
General Radio Company Products
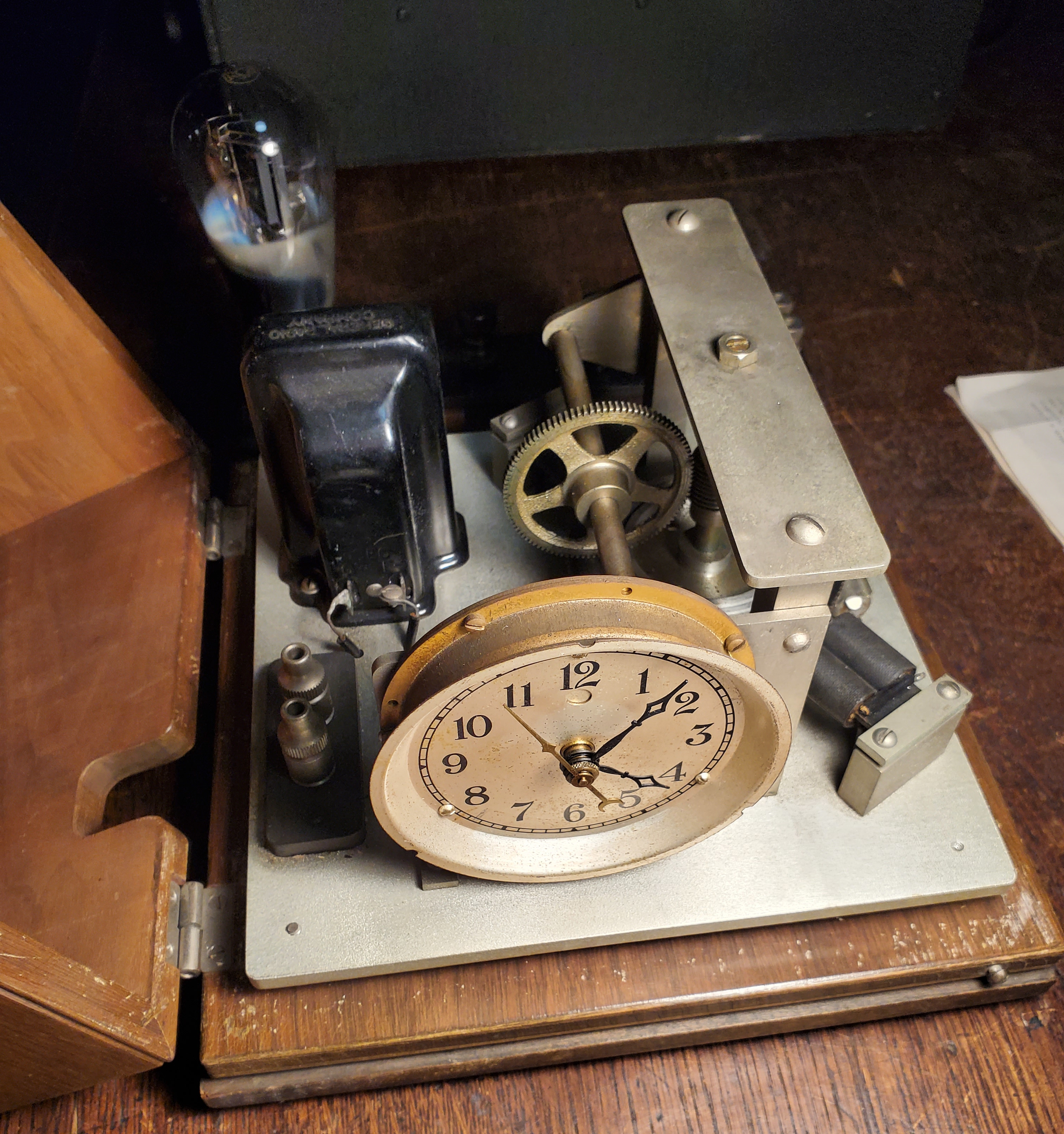
Type 411, Syncro-Clock - a synchronous motor precision clock

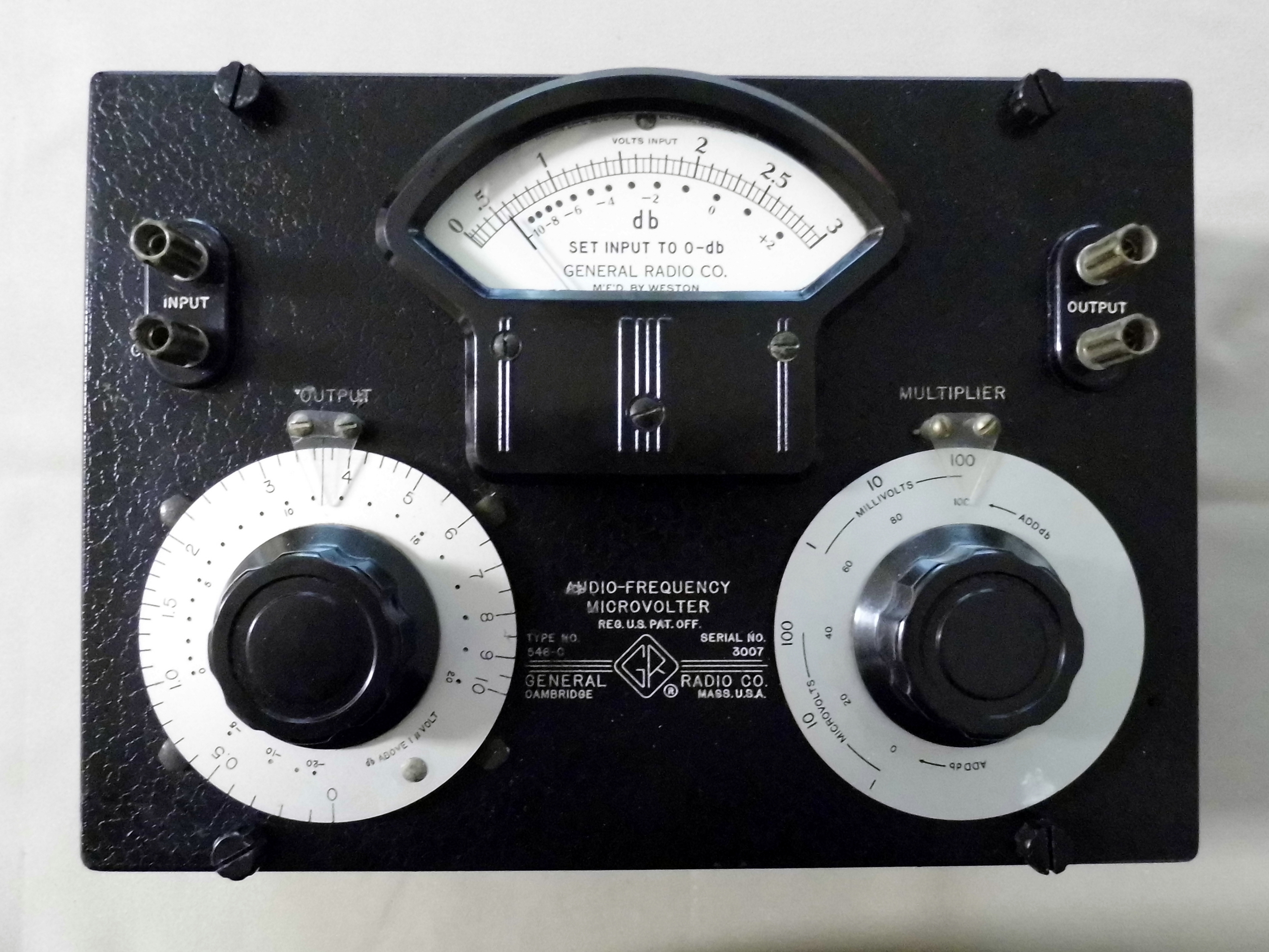
Type 546-0, Audio-Frequency Microvolter

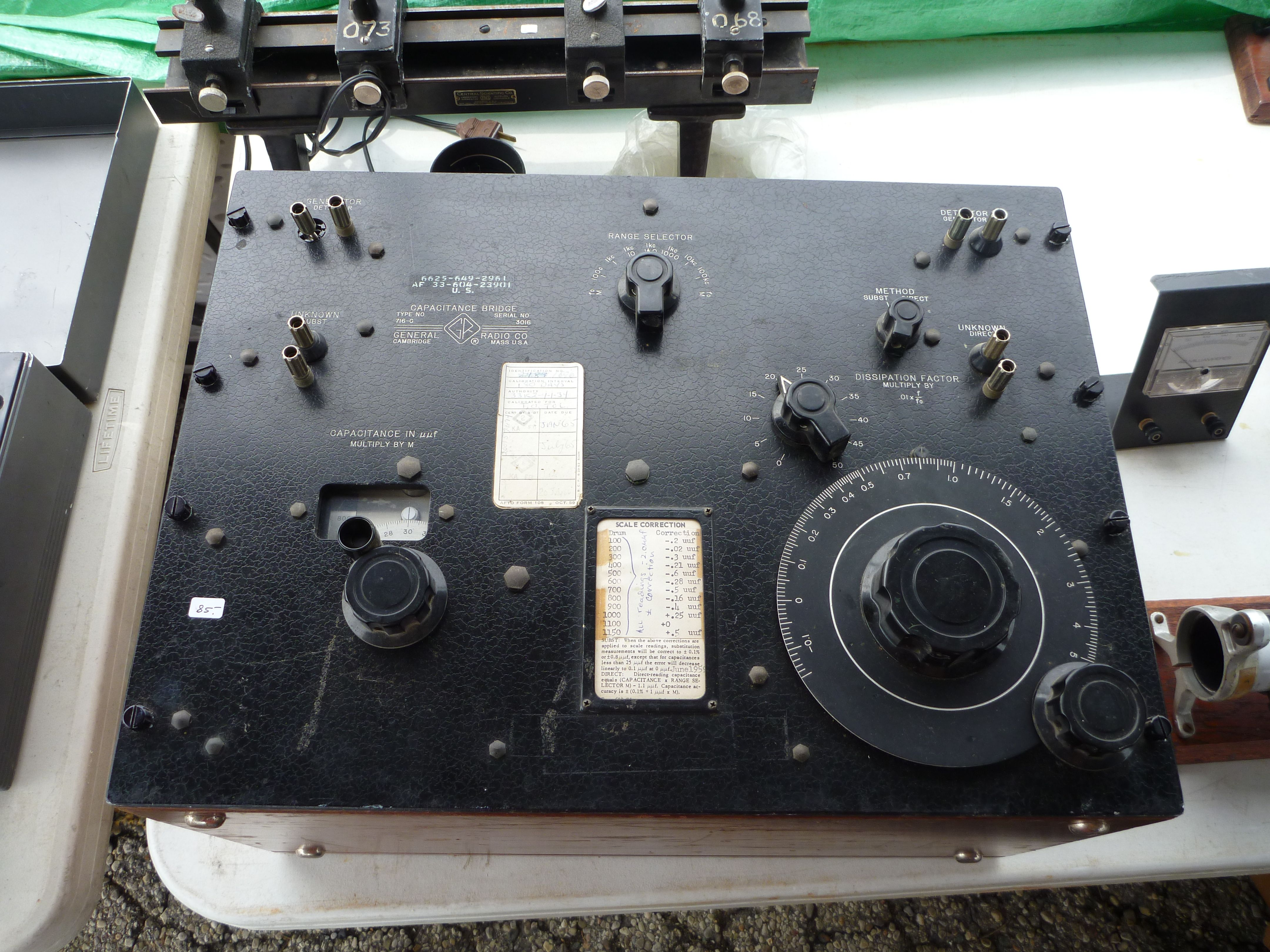
Type 716-C, Capacitance Bridge

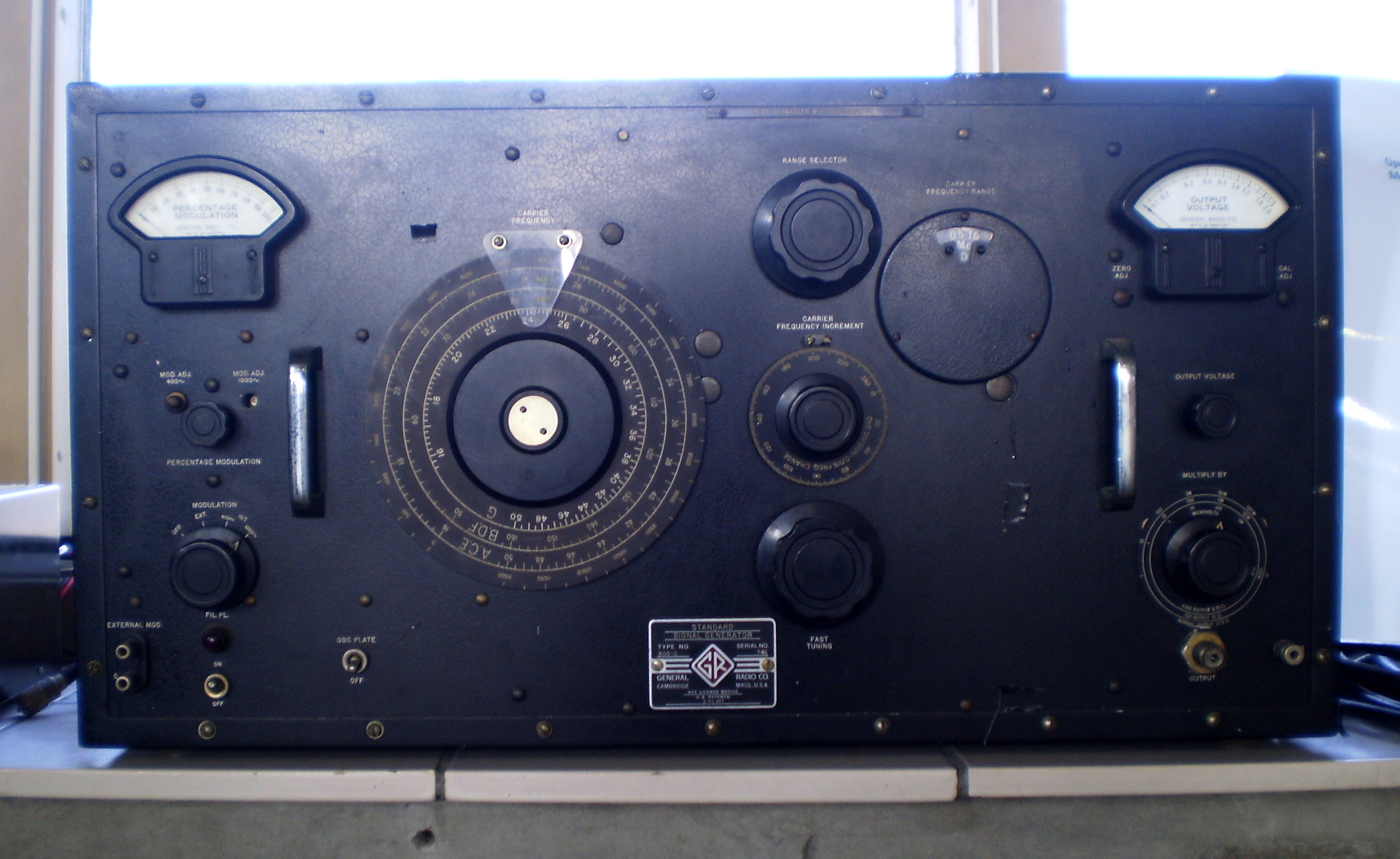
Type 805-C, Signal Generator

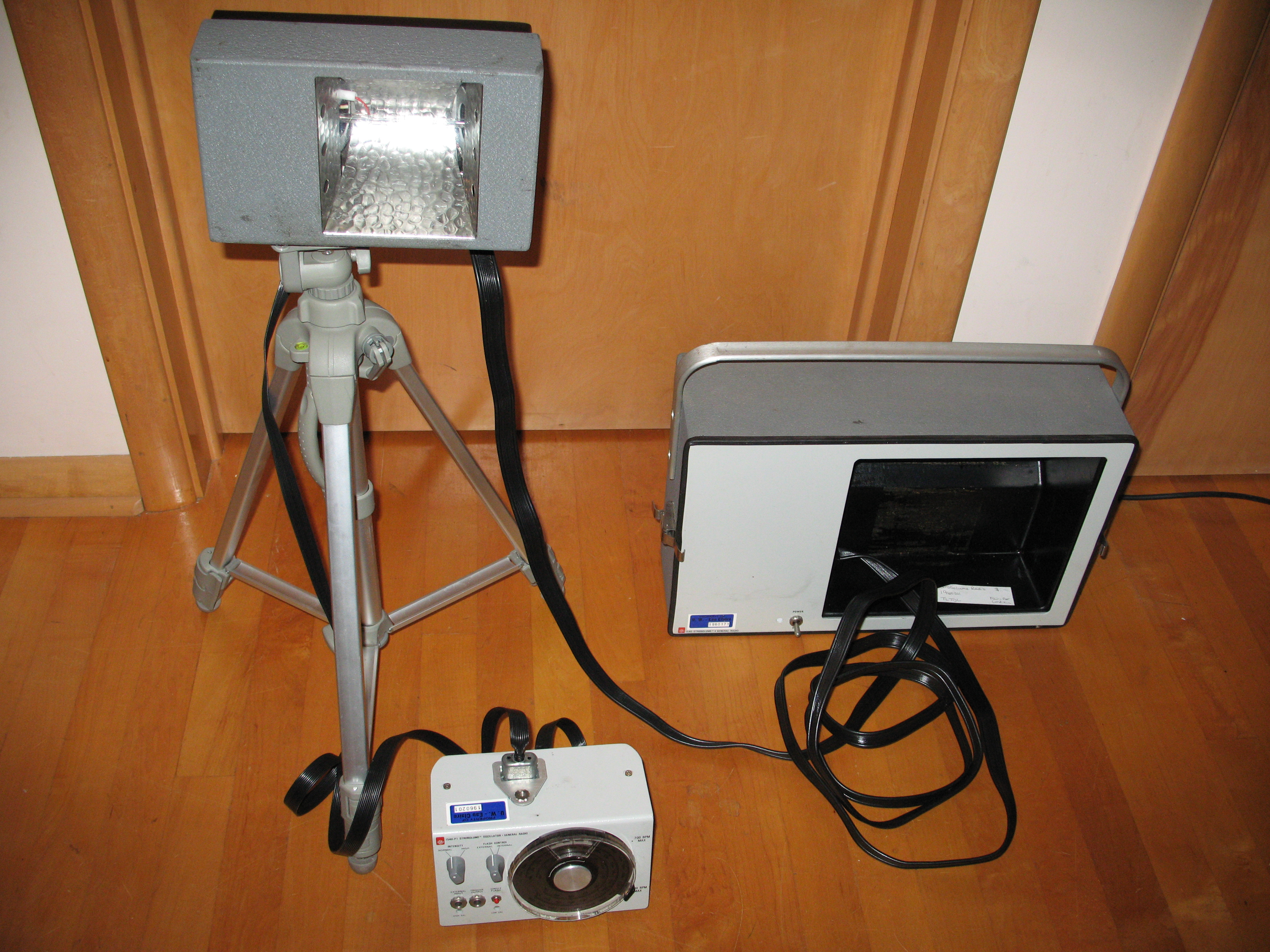
Type 1540 Strobolume, a professional grade stroboscope
