= Concert pitch =

Reference point for tuning musical instruments

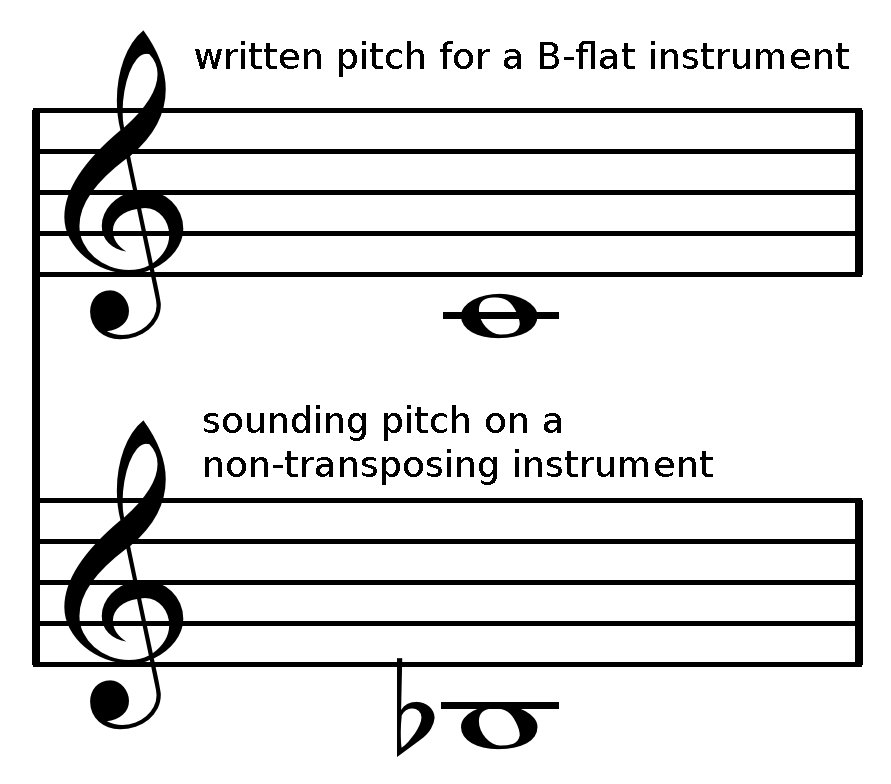
A written C, top, on a B♭ clarinet sounds a concert B♭, bottom.

Concert pitch is the pitch reference to which a group of musical instruments are tuned for a performance. Concert pitch may vary from ensemble to ensemble, and has varied widely over time. The ISO defines international standard pitch as A440, setting 440 Hz as the frequency of the A above middle C. Frequencies of other notes are defined relative to this pitch.

The written pitches for transposing instruments do not match those of non-transposing instruments. For example, a written C on a B♭ clarinet or trumpet sounds as a non-transposing instrument's B♭. The term "concert pitch" is used to refer to the pitch on a non-transposing instrument, to distinguish it from the transposing instrument's written note. The clarinet or trumpet's written C is thus referred to as "concert B♭".

== Modern standard concert pitch ==
440 Hz

The A above middle C is often set at the international standard of 440 Hz. Historically, this A has been tuned to a variety of different pitches.

== History of pitch standards in Western music ==
Historically, various standards have been used to fix the pitch of notes at certain frequencies. Various systems of musical tuning have also been used to determine the relative frequency of notes in a scale.

=== Pre-19th century ===
Until the 19th century there was no coordinated effort to standardize musical pitch, and it could vary by several semitones between cities. Pitch standards in the early modern era were typically calibrated either by using pitch pipes, by defining the length of an organ pipe, or in relation to another instrument in an ensemble. Such calibrations could be dependent on temperature or on the consistency of the measurement units used in different places. Some early scientists, such as Marin Mersenne, had made rough measurements of pitch, but it was only after the tuning fork was invented in 1711 that temperature-independent pitch calibration became possible. Variation continued between different composers, locations, and types of performances, however. For example, a 1740 tuning fork associated with Handel is pitched at A = 422.5 Hz, while a specimen from 1780 is pitched at A = 409 Hz, about a quarter-tone lower. A tuning fork that belonged to Ludwig van Beethoven around 1800, now in the British Library, is pitched at A = 455.4 Hz, well over a half-tone higher.

=== Pitch inflation ===
When instrumental music has risen in prominence (relative to vocal music), there has been a consistent tendency for pitch standards to rise. This led to reform efforts on at least two occasions. At the beginning of the 17th century, Michael Praetorius reported in his encyclopedic Syntagma musicum that pitch levels had become so high that singers were experiencing severe throat strain and lutenists and viol players were complaining of snapped strings. The standard voice ranges he cites show that the pitch level of his time, at least in the part of Germany where he lived, was at least a minor third higher than today's. Solutions to this problem were sporadic and local, but generally involved the establishment of separate standards for voice and organ (German: Chorton, lit. 'choir tone') and for chamber ensembles (German: Kammerton, lit. 'chamber tone'). Where the two were combined, as for example in a cantata, the singers and instrumentalists might use music written in different keys. This kept pitch inflation at bay for some two centuries.

Concert pitch rose further in the 19th century, evidenced by tuning forks of that era in France. The pipe organ tuning fork in Versailles Chapel from 1795 is 390 Hz, an 1810 Paris Opera tuning fork sounds at A = 423 Hz, an 1822 fork gives A = 432 Hz, and an 1855 fork gives A = 449 Hz. At La Scala in Milan the A above middle C rose as high as 451 Hz.

=== 19th- and 20th-century standards ===
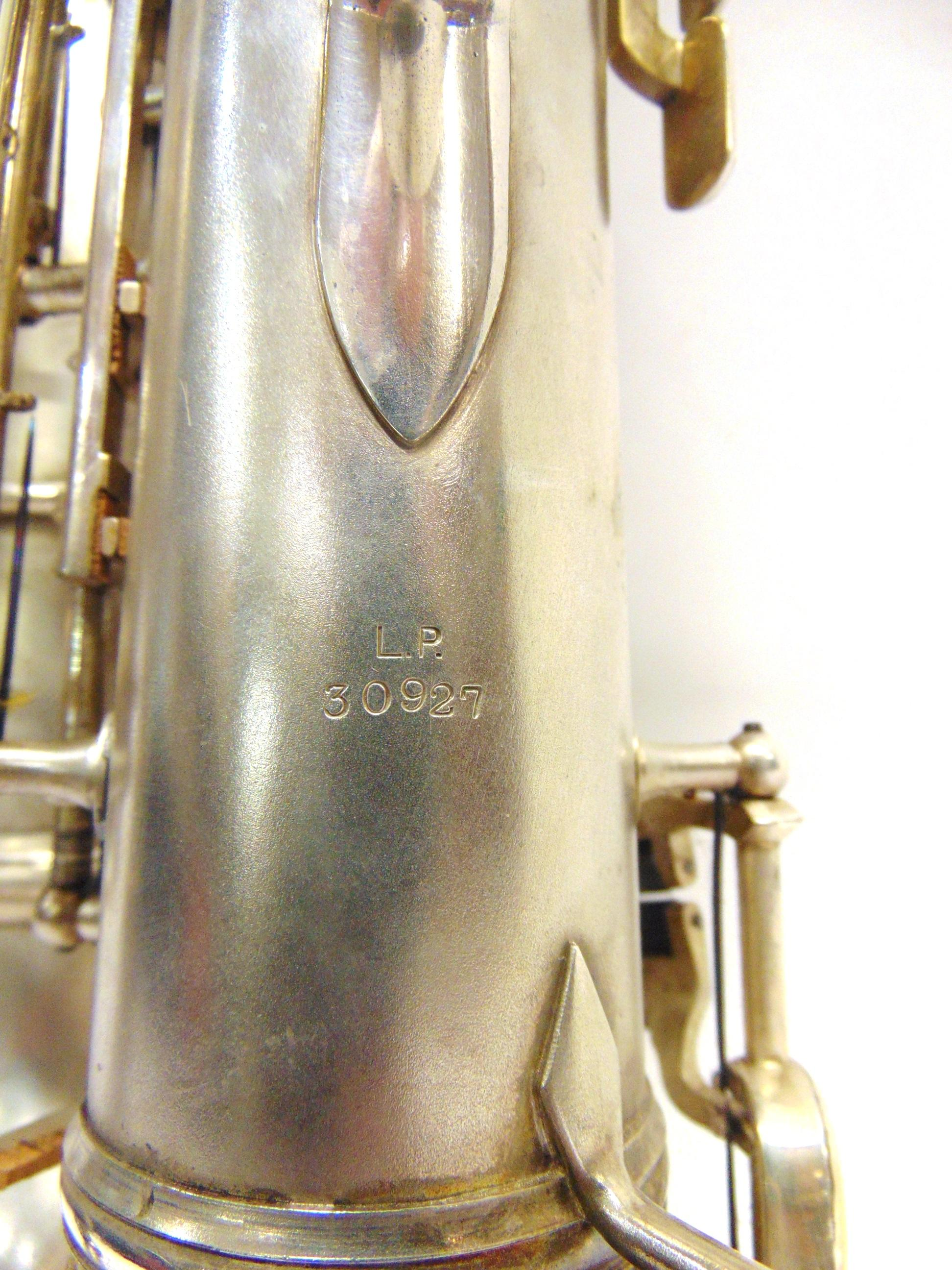
A circa 1932 Boosey & Hawkes 'Model 32' alto saxophone stamped 'LP' for Low Pitch (A=440 Hz). Saxophones tuned to A=456 Hz would be marked 'H', 'HP' or 'High Pitch'

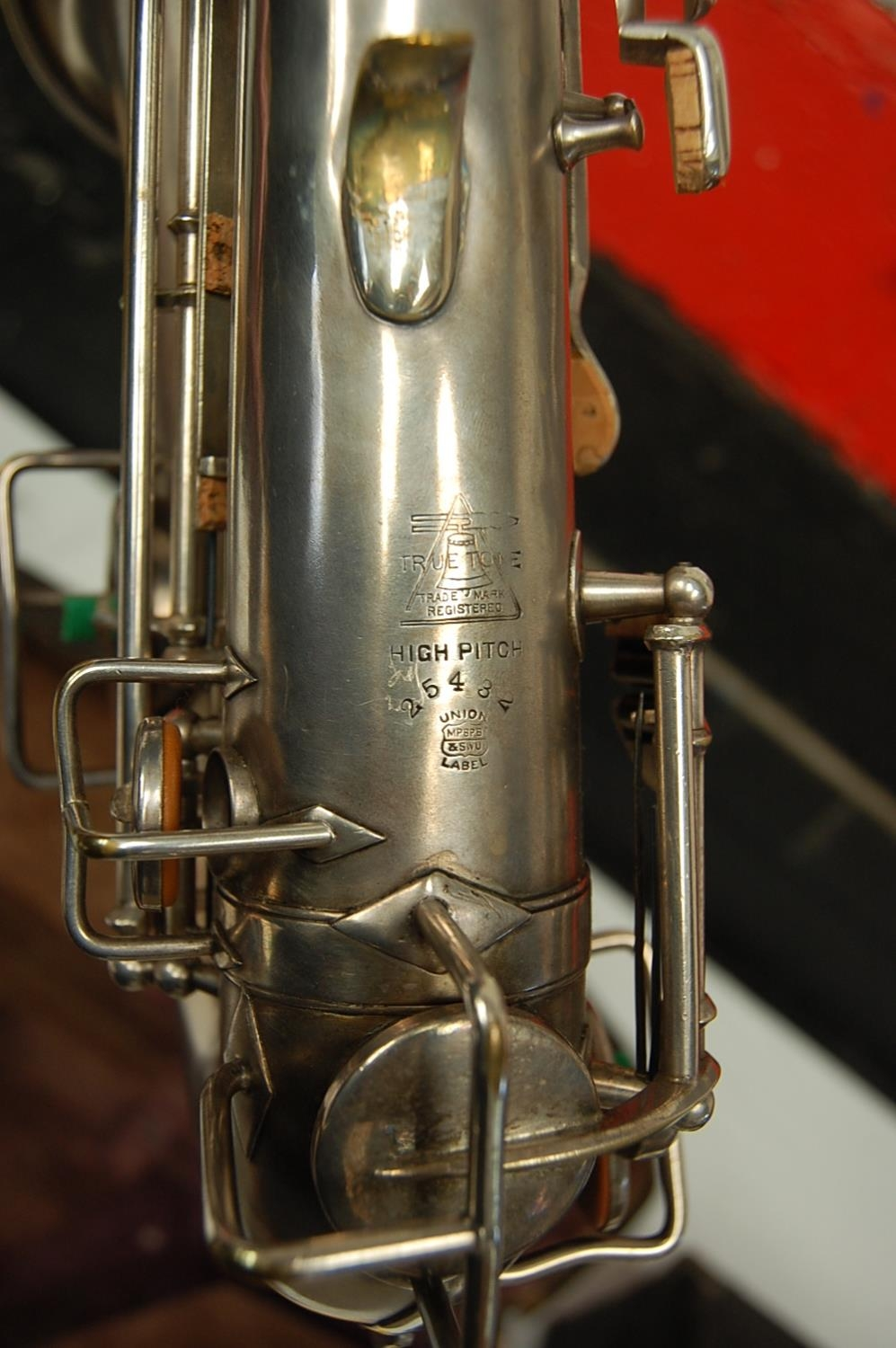
A 1915 Buescher Truetone alto saxophone marked 'High Pitch' (A=456 Hertz). Saxophones tuned to A=440 Hz would be marked 'L', 'LP' or 'Low Pitch'

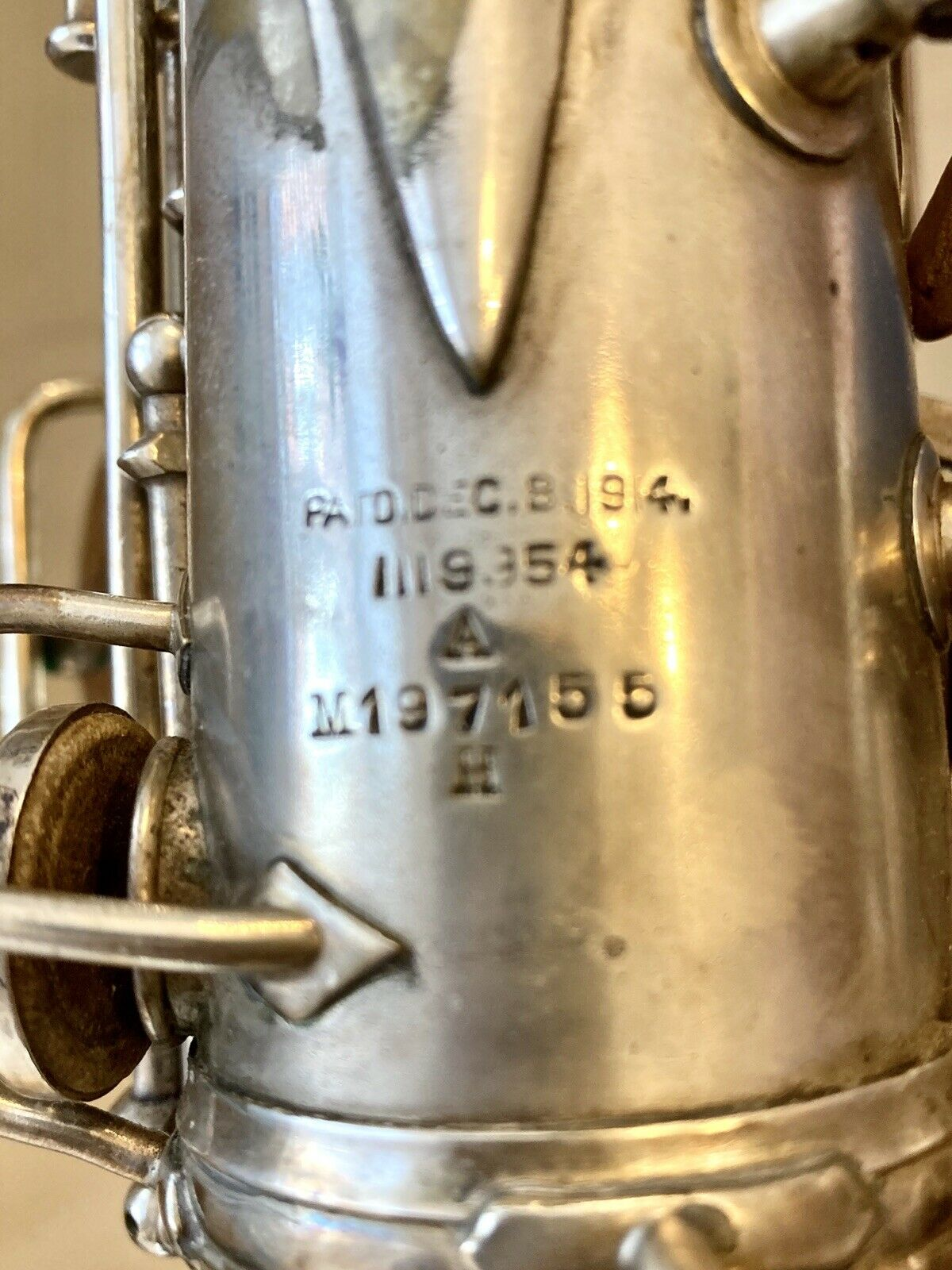
A 1927 Conn New Wonder Series 2 alto saxophone marked 'H' for 'High Pitch' (A=456 Hertz)

Rising pitch put a strain on singers' voices and, largely due to their protests, the French government passed a law on February 16, 1859 setting the A above middle C at 435 Hz. This was the first attempt to standardize pitch on such a scale, and was known as the diapason normal. It became a popular pitch standard outside France as well, and has been known at various times as French pitch, continental pitch or international pitch (this international pitch is not the 1939 "international standard pitch" described below). An 1885 conference in Vienna established this standard in Italy, Austria, Hungary, Russia, Prussia, Saxony, Sweden and Württemberg. This was included as "Convention of 16 and 19 November 1885 regarding the establishment of a concert pitch" in the Treaty of Versailles in 1919 which formally ended World War I. The diapason normal resulted in middle C being tuned at about 258.65 Hz.

An alternative pitch standard known as philosophical or scientific pitch fixes middle C at 256 Hz (that is, 2^{8} Hz), which places the A above it at approximately 430.54 Hz in equal temperament tuning. The appeal of this system is its mathematical idealism (the frequencies of all the Cs being powers of two). This never received the same official recognition as the French A = 435 Hz and has not been widely used. This tuning has been promoted unsuccessfully by the LaRouche movement's Schiller Institute under the name Verdi tuning since Italian composer Giuseppe Verdi had proposed a slight lowering of the French tuning system. However, the Schiller Institute's recommended tuning for A of 432 Hz uses the Pythagorean ratio of 27:16, rather than the logarithmic ratio of equal temperament tuning.

British attempts at standardization in the 19th century gave rise to the old philharmonic pitch standard of about A = 452 Hz (different sources quote slightly different values), replaced in 1896 by the considerably lower new philharmonic pitch of A = 439 Hz. The high pitch was maintained by Sir Michael Costa for the Crystal Palace Handel Festivals, causing the withdrawal of the principal tenor Sims Reeves in 1877, though at singers' insistence the Birmingham Festival pitch was lowered and the organ retuned at that time. At the Queen's Hall in London, the establishment of the diapason normal for the Promenade Concerts in 1895 (and retuning of the organ to A = 435.5 at 15 °C (59 °F), to be in tune with A = 439 in a heated hall) caused the Royal Philharmonic Society and others (including the Bach Choir, and the Felix Mottl and Arthur Nikisch concerts) to adopt the continental pitch.

In England the term low pitch was used from 1896 onward to refer to the new Philharmonic Society tuning standard of A = 439 Hz at 68 °F (20 °C), while "high pitch" was used for the older tuning of A = 452.4 Hz at 60 °F (16 °C). Although the larger London orchestras were quick to conform to the new low pitch, provincial orchestras continued using the high pitch until at least the 1920s, and most brass bands were still using the high pitch in the mid-1960s. Highland pipe bands continue to use an even sharper tuning, around A = 470–480 Hz, over a semitone higher than A440 and close to B♭ (about 466.16 Hz) on that scale.

In 1834 the Stuttgart Conference of the Society of German Natural Scientists and Physicians recommended C264 (A440) as the standard pitch based on Scheibler's studies with his Tonometer. For this reason A440 has been referred to as Stuttgart pitch or Scheibler pitch.

In 1939 an international conference recommended that the A above middle C be tuned to 440 Hz, now known as concert pitch. This was adopted as a technical standard by the International Organization for Standardization in 1955 and reaffirmed by them in 1975 as ISO 16. The difference between this and the diapason normal is due to confusion over the temperature at which the French standard should be measured. The initial standard was A = 439 Hz, but this was superseded by A = 440 Hz, possibly because 439 Hz was difficult to reproduce in a laboratory since 439 is a prime number.

In 1964, of 31 top professional U.S. orchestras, 19 were tuning at 440, the others at 441 or 442. In 1987, the New York Times surveyed international practice, noting that “the A of most symphony and opera orchestras today ranges between 440 and 444.”

== Current concert pitches ==
The most common standard around the world is currently A = 440 Hz.

In practice, most orchestras tune to a note given out by the oboe, and most oboists use an electronic tuning device when playing the tuning note. Some orchestras tune using an electronic tone generator. When playing with fixed-pitch instruments, such as the piano, the orchestra will generally tune to them—a piano will normally have been tuned to the orchestra's normal pitch. Overall, it is thought that the general trend since the middle of the 20th century has been for standard pitch to rise, though it has been rising far more slowly than it has in the past. Some orchestras, like the Berlin Philharmonic, now use a slightly lower pitch (443 Hz) than their highest previous standard (445 Hz).

Many modern ensembles who specialize in the performance of Baroque music have agreed on a standard of A = 415 Hz. An exact equal-tempered semitone lower than 440 Hz would be 415.305 Hz, though this is rounded to the nearest integer for simplicity and convenience. In principle, this allows for playing along with modern fixed-pitch instruments if their parts are transposed down a semitone. It is, however, common performance practice, especially in the German Baroque idiom, to tune certain works to Chorton, approximately a semitone higher than 440 Hz (460–470 Hz) (e.g., Pre-Leipzig period cantatas of Bach).

Orchestras in Cuba typically use A436 as the pitch so that strings, which are difficult to obtain, last longer. In 2015, American pianist Simone Dinnerstein brought attention to this issue and later traveled to Cuba with strings donated by friends.

=== Controversial claims for 432 Hz ===
Particularly in the beginning of the 21st century, many websites and online videos have been published arguing for the adoption of the 432 Hz tuning – often referred to as "Verdi pitch" – instead of the predominant 440 Hz. These claims also include conspiracy theories, related to specious claims of healing properties from 432 Hz pitch, or involving Nazis having favored the 440 Hz tuning.
