= Chua's circuit =

Electronic circuit that behaves chaotically

Chua's circuit. The component N_{R} is a nonlinear negative resistance called a Chua's diode. It is usually made of a circuit containing an amplifier with positive feedback.

The current–voltage characteristic of the Chua diode

Chua's circuit (also known as a Chua circuit) is a simple electronic circuit that exhibits classic chaotic behavior. This means roughly that it is a "nonperiodic oscillator"; it produces an oscillating waveform that, unlike an ordinary electronic oscillator, never "repeats". It was invented in 1983 by Leon O. Chua, who was a visitor at Waseda University in Japan at that time. The ease of construction of the circuit has made it a ubiquitous real-world example of a chaotic system, leading some to declare it "a paradigm for chaos".

== Chaotic criteria ==
One version of Chua's circuit, where the nonlinear Chua's diode is synthesized by an op amp negative impedance converter (OPA1) and a diode–resistor network (D1, D2, both R2)

An autonomous circuit made from standard components (resistors, capacitors, inductors) must satisfy three criteria before it can display chaotic behaviour. It must contain:

1. one or more nonlinear elements,
2. one or more locally active resistors,
3. three or more energy-storage elements.

Chua's circuit is the simplest electronic circuit meeting these criteria. As shown in the top figure, the energy storage elements are two capacitors (labeled C1 and C2) and an inductor (labeled L; L1 in lower figure). A "locally active resistor" is a device that has negative resistance and is active (it can amplify), providing the power to generate the oscillating current. The locally active resistor and nonlinearity are combined in the device N_{R}, which is called "Chua's diode". This device is not sold commercially but is implemented in various ways by active circuits. The circuit diagram shows one common implementation. The nonlinear resistor is implemented by two linear resistors and two diodes. At the far right is a negative impedance converter made from three linear resistors and an operational amplifier, which implements the locally active resistance (negative resistance).

== Dynamics ==
Computer simulation of Chua's circuit after 100 seconds, showing chaotic "double scroll" attractor pattern

Chua's attractor

Chua's attractor for different values of the α parameter

Analyzing the circuit using Kirchhoff's circuit laws, the dynamics of Chua's circuit can be accurately modeled by means of a system of three nonlinear ordinary differential equations in the variables x(t), y(t), and z(t), which represent the voltages across the capacitors C1 and C2 and the electric current in the inductor L1 respectively. These equations are:

$$\frac{dx}{dt} = \alpha [y - x - f(x)],$$
$$RC_2 \frac{dy}{dt} = x - y + Rz,$$
$$\frac{dz}{dt} = -\beta y.$$

The function f(x) describes the electrical response of the nonlinear resistor, and its shape depends on the particular configuration of its components. The parameters α and β are determined by the particular values of the circuit components.

A computer-assisted proof of chaotic behavior (more precisely, of positive topological entropy) in Chua's circuit was published in 1997. A self-excited chaotic attractor, known as "the double scroll" because of its shape in the (x, y, z) space, was first observed in a circuit containing a nonlinear element such that f(x) was a 3-segment piecewise-linear function.

The easy experimental implementation of the circuit, combined with the existence of a simple and accurate theoretical model, makes Chua's circuit a useful system to study many fundamental and applied issues of chaos theory. Because of this, it has been object of much study and appears widely referenced in the literature.

Further, Chua' s circuit can be easily realized by using a multilayer CNN (cellular nonlinear network). CNNs were invented by Leon Chua in 1988.

The Chua diode can also be replaced by a memristor; an experimental setup that implemented Chua's chaotic circuit with a memristor was demonstrated by Muthuswamy in 2009; the memristor was actually implemented with active components in this experiment.

== Self-excited and hidden Chua attractors ==
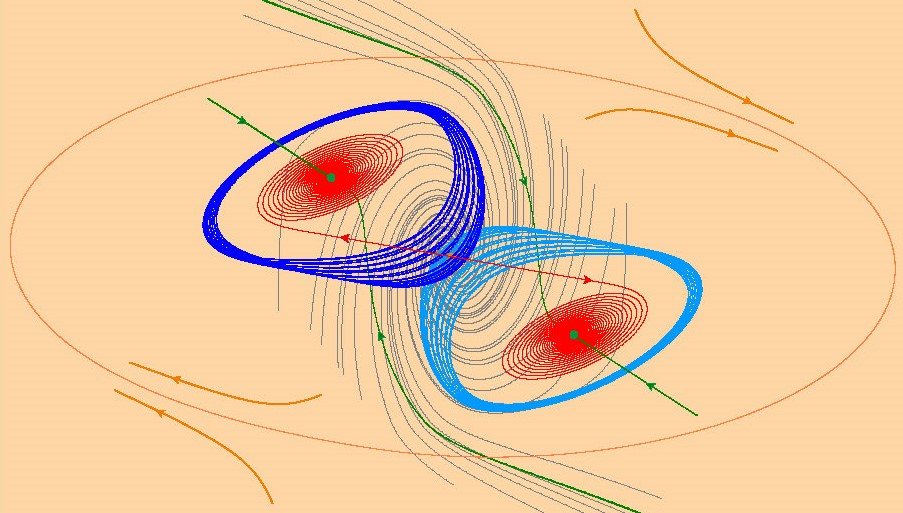
Two hidden chaotic attractors and one hidden periodic attractor coexist with two trivial attractors in Chua circuit (from the IJBC cover).

The classical implementation of Chua circuit is switched on at the zero initial data, thus a conjecture was that the chaotic behavior is possible only in the case of unstable zero equilibrium. In this case a chaotic attractor in mathematical model can be obtained numerically, with relative ease, by standard computational procedure where after transient process a trajectory, started from a point of unstable manifold in a small neighborhood of unstable zero equilibrium, reaches and computes a self-excited attractor. To date, a large number of various types of self-excited chaotic attractors in Chua's system have been discovered. However, in 2009, N. Kuznetsov discovered hidden Chua's attractors coexisting with stable zero equilibrium, and since then various scenarios of the birth of hidden attractors have been described.

== Experimental confirmation ==
First experimental confirmation of self-excited chaos from Chua's circuit was reported in 1985 at the Electronics Research Lab at U.C. Berkeley. First confirmation of hidden chaos was reported in 2022 at the Theoretical Nonlinear Dynamics Lab at the Institute of Radio-engineering and Electronics of the Russian Academy of Sciences.

== See also ==
- Chaos computing
- Multiscroll attractor
