= Multiscroll attractor =

Strange attractor connected by two 2-dimensional rings

A double-scroll Chen attractor from a simulation

In the mathematics of dynamical systems, the double-scroll attractor (sometimes known as Chua's attractor) is a strange attractor observed from a physical electronic chaotic circuit (generally, Chua's circuit) with a single nonlinear resistor (see Chua's diode). The double-scroll system is often described by a system of three nonlinear ordinary differential equations and a 3-segment piecewise-linear equation (see Chua's equations). This makes the system easily simulated numerically and easily manifested physically due to Chua's circuits' simple design.

Using a Chua's circuit, this shape is viewed on an oscilloscope using the X, Y, and Z output signals of the circuit. This chaotic attractor is known as the double scroll because of its shape in three-dimensional space, which is similar to two saturn-like rings connected by swirling lines.

The attractor was first observed in simulations, then realized physically after Leon Chua invented the autonomous chaotic circuit which became known as Chua's circuit. The double-scroll attractor from the Chua circuit was rigorously proven to be chaotic through a number of Poincaré return maps of the attractor explicitly derived by way of compositions of the eigenvectors of the 3-dimensional state space.

Numerical analysis of the double-scroll attractor has shown that its geometrical structure is made up of an infinite number of fractal-like layers. Each cross section appears to be a fractal at all scales. Recently, there has also been reported the discovery of hidden attractors within the double scroll.

In 1999 Guanrong Chen (陈关荣) and Ueta proposed another double scroll chaotic attractor, called the Chen system or Chen attractor.

== Chen attractor ==
The Chen system is defined as follows

$\frac{dx(t)}{dt}=a(y(t)-x(t))$

$\frac{dy(t)}{dt}=(c-a)x(t)-x(t)z(t)+cy(t)$

$\frac{dz(t)}{dt}=x(t)y(t)-bz(t)$

Plots of Chen attractor can be obtained with the Runge-Kutta method:

parameters: a = 40, c = 28, b = 3

initial conditions: x(0) = -0.1, y(0) = 0.5, z(0) = -0.6

== Other attractors ==
Multiscroll attractors also called n-scroll attractor include the Lu Chen attractor, the modified Chen chaotic attractor, PWL Duffing attractor, Rabinovich Fabrikant attractor, modified Chua chaotic attractor, that is, multiple scrolls in a single attractor.

=== Lu Chen attractor ===
Lu Chen Attractor

An extended Chen system with multiscroll was proposed by Jinhu Lu (吕金虎) and Guanrong Chen

Lu Chen system equation

$\frac{dx(t)}{dt}=a(y(t)-x(t))$

$\frac{dy(t)}{dt}=x(t)-x(t)z(t)+cy(t)+u$

$\frac{dz(t)}{dt}=x(t)y(t)-bz(t)$

parameters：a = 36, c = 20, b = 3, u = -15.15

initial conditions：x(0) = .1, y(0) = .3, z(0) = -.6

=== Modified Lu Chen attractor ===
Lu Chen Attractor modified

System equations:

$\frac{dx(t)}{dt}=a(y(t)-x(t)),$

$\frac{dy(t)}{dt}=(c-a)x(t)-x(t)f+cy(t),$

$\frac{dz(t)}{dt}=x(t)y(t)-bz(t)$

In which

$f = d0z(t) + d1z(t - \tau ) - d2\sin(z(t - \tau ))$

params := a = 35, c = 28, b = 3, d0 = 1, d1 = 1, d2 = -20..20, tau = .2

initv := x(0) = 1, y(0) = 1, z(0) = 14

=== Modified Chua chaotic attractor ===
Chua Attractor

In 2001, Tang et al. proposed a modified Chua chaotic system

$\frac{dx(t)}{dt}= \alpha (y(t)-h)$

$\frac{dy(t)}{dt}=x(t)-y(t)+z(t)$

$\frac{dz(t)}{dt}=-\beta y(t)$

In which

$h := -b \sin\left(\frac{\pi x(t)}{2a}+d\right)$

params := alpha = 10.82, beta = 14.286, a = 1.3, b = .11, c = 7, d = 0

initv := x(0) = 1, y(0) = 1, z(0) = 0

=== PWL Duffing chaotic attractor ===
PWL Duffing Attractor

Aziz Alaoui investigated PWL Duffing equation in 2000:

PWL Duffing system:

$\frac{dx(t)}{dt}=y(t)$

$\frac{dy(t)}{dt}=-m_1x(t)-(1/2(m_0-m_1))(|x(t)+1|-|x(t)-1|)-ey(t)+\gamma \cos(\omega t)$

params := e = .25, gamma = .14+(1/20)i, m0 = -0.845e-1, m1 = .66, omega = 1; c := (.14+(1/20)i)，i=-25...25;

initv := x(0) = 0, y(0) = 0;

=== Modified Lorenz chaotic system ===
Lorenz system modified

Miranda & Stone proposed a modified Lorenz system:

$\frac{dx(t)}{dt} = 1/3*(-(a+1)x(t)+a-c+z(t)y(t))+((1-a)(x(t)^2-y(t)^2)+(2(a+c-z(t)))x(t)y(t))$$\frac{1}{3\sqrt{x(t)^2+y(t)^2}}$

$\frac{dy(t)}{dt}= 1/3((c-a-z(t))x(t)-(a+1)y(t))+((2(a-1))x(t)y(t)+(a+c-z(t))(x(t)^2-y(t)^2))$$\frac{1}{3\sqrt{x(t)^2+y(t)^2}}$

$\frac{dz(t)}{dt} = 1/2(3x(t)^2y(t)-y(t)^3)-bz(t)$

parameters： a = 10, b = 8/3, c = 137/5;

initial conditions： x(0) = -8, y(0) = 4, z(0) = 10

== Gallery ==
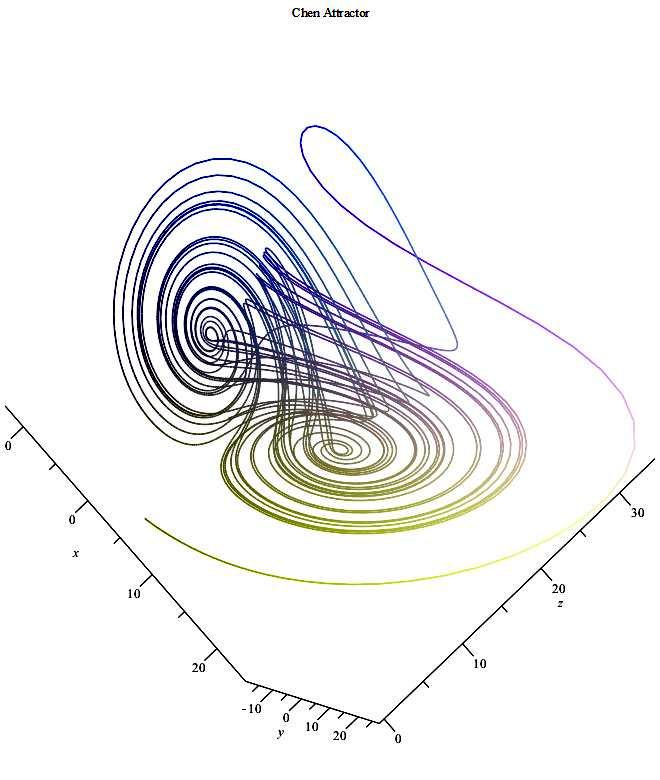
Chen attractor

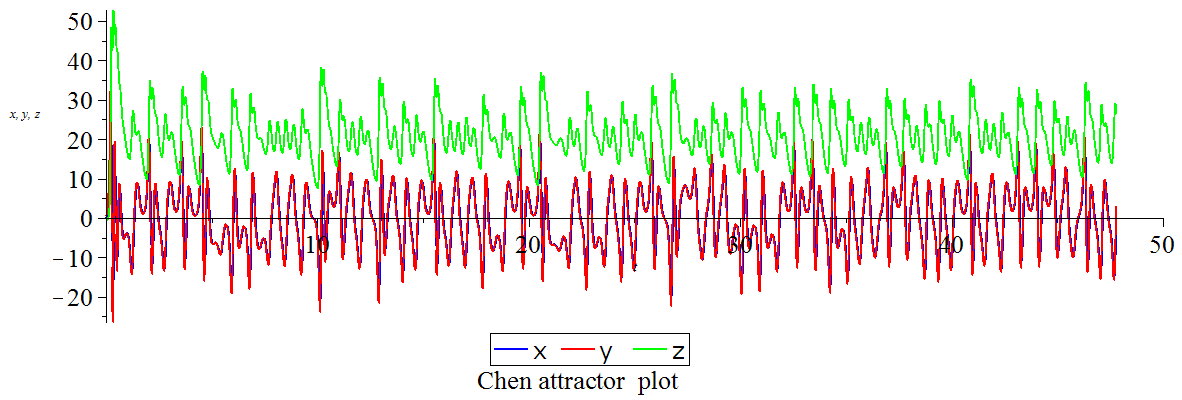
parameters a = 35, c = 27, b = 2.8,x(0) = -.1, y(0) = .3, z(0) = -.6

Lu Chen attractor

Maple plot of N scroll attractor based on Chen with sine and tau

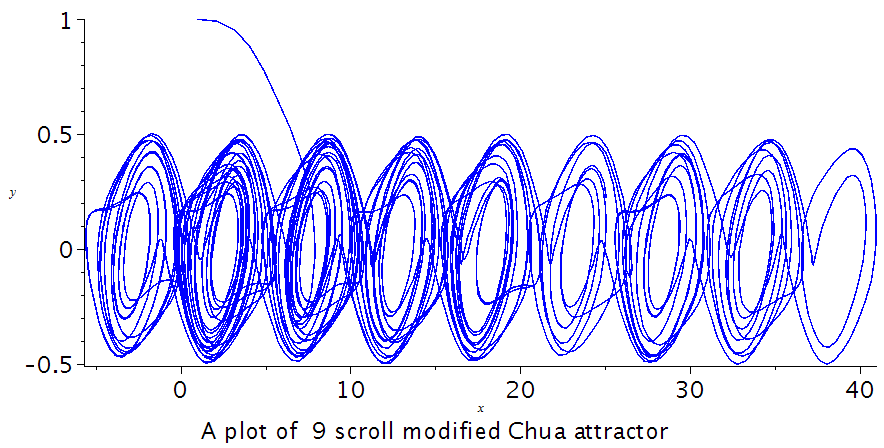
9 scroll modified Chua chaotic attractor

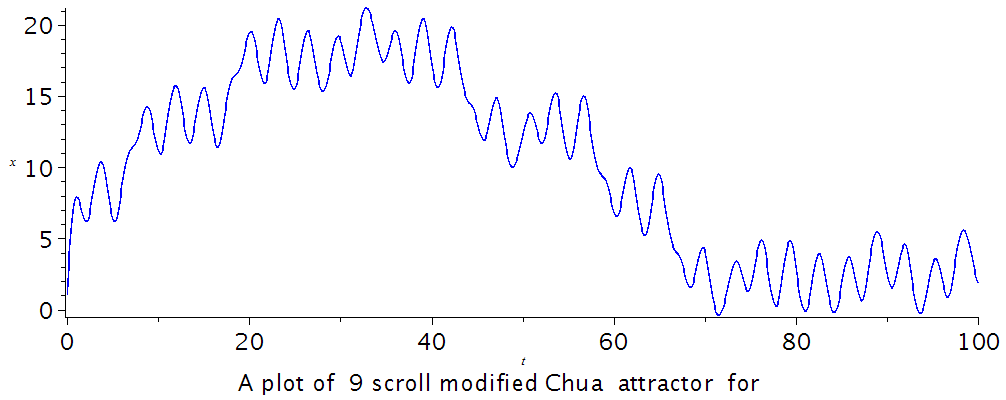
xy plot of 9 scroll modified Chua chaotic attractor

PWL Duffing chaotic attractor xy plot

PWL Duffing chaotic attractor plot

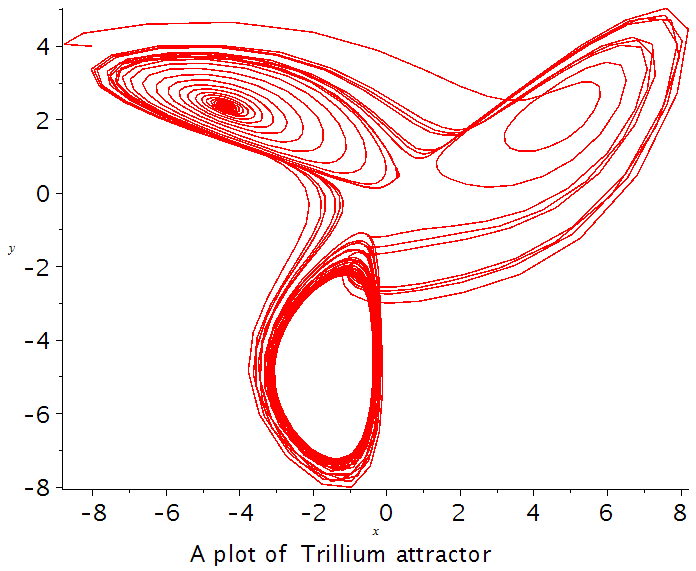
modified Lorenz attractor

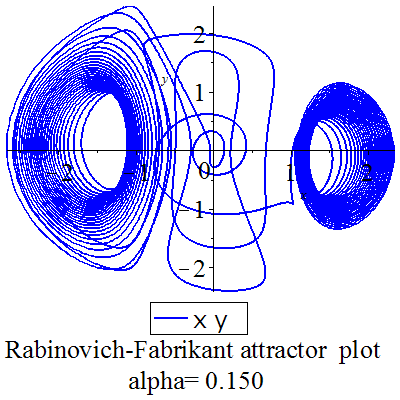
Rabinovich Fabrikant attractor xy plot
