= Passive sign convention =

Electrical engineering standard

Illustration of the "reference directions" of the current $i(t)$, voltage $v(t)$, and power $p(t)$ variables used in the passive sign convention. If positive current is defined as flowing into the device terminal which is defined to be positive voltage, then positive power (big arrow) given by the equation $p = i \, v$ represents electric power flowing into the device, and negative power represents power flowing out.

In electrical engineering, the passive sign convention (PSC) is a sign convention or arbitrary standard rule adopted universally by the electrical engineering community for defining the sign of electric power in an electric circuit. The convention defines electric power flowing out of the circuit into an electrical component as positive, and power flowing into the circuit out of a component as negative. So a passive component which consumes power, such as an appliance or light bulb, will have positive power dissipation, while an active component, a source of power such as an electric generator or battery, will have negative power dissipation. This is the standard definition of power in electric circuits; it is used for example in computer circuit simulation programs such as SPICE.

To comply with the convention, the direction of the voltage and current variables used to calculate power and resistance in the component must have a certain relationship: the current variable must be defined so positive current enters the positive voltage terminal of the device. These directions may be different from the directions of the actual current flow and voltage.

== The convention ==
The passive sign convention states that in components in which the conventional current variable i is defined as entering the device through the terminal which is positive as defined by the voltage variable v, the power p and resistance r are given by

$p = vi \,$ and $r = {v \over i} \,$

In components in which the current i is defined such that positive current enters the device through the negative voltage terminal, power and resistance are given by

$p = -vi \,$ and $r = -{v \over i} \qquad\,$

With these definitions, passive components (loads) will have p > 0 and r > 0, and active components (power sources) will have p < 0 and r < 0.

== Explanation ==
Power source (active component)

Load (passive component)

The arrows E represent the direction of the electric field

=== Active and passive components ===
In electrical engineering, power represents the rate of electrical energy flowing into or out of a given device (electrical component) or control volume. Power is a signed quantity; negative power represents power flowing in the opposite direction from positive power. A simple component (shown in these diagrams as a rectangle) is connected to the circuit by two wires, through which electric current passes through the device. From the standpoint of power flow, electrical components in a circuit can be divided into two types:

- In a source or active component, such as a battery or electric generator, electric current (conventional current, flow of positive charges) is forced to move through the device in the direction of greater electric potential, from the negative to the positive voltage terminal. This is opposite to the direction of the force on the charges from the electric field. This increases the potential energy of the electric charges, so electric power flows out of the component into the circuit. Work must be done on the moving charges by some source of energy in the component, to make them move in this direction against the opposing force of the electric field E.
- In a load or passive component, such as a light bulb, resistor, or electric motor, the current moves through the device under the influence of the electric field E in the direction of lower electric potential, from the positive terminal to the negative. So work is done by the charges on the component; potential energy flows out of the charges; and electric power flows from the circuit into the component, where it is converted to some other form of energy such as heat or mechanical work.

Some components can be either a source or a load, depending on the voltage or current through them. For example, a rechargeable battery acts as a source when used to supply energy but as a load when it is being recharged. A capacitor or an inductor acts as a load when it is storing energy in its electric or magnetic field from the external circuit, respectively, but as a source when it is releasing into the external circuit the stored energy from the electric or magnetic field.

Since it can flow in either direction, there are two possible ways to define electric power; two possible reference directions: either power flowing into an electrical component or power flowing out of the component, which can be defined as positive. Whichever is defined as positive, the other will be negative. The passive sign convention arbitrarily defines power flowing into the component (out of the circuit) as positive, so passive components have "positive" power flow.

In an AC (alternating current) circuit, the current and voltage switch direction with each half-cycle of the current, but the definitions above still apply. At any given instant, in nonreactive passive components, the current flows from the positive terminal to the negative, while in nonreactive active components, it flows the other direction. In addition, components with reactance (capacitance or inductance) store energy temporarily, so they act as sources or sinks in different parts of the AC cycle. For example, in a capacitor, when the voltage across it is increasing, the current is directed into the positive terminal, so the component is storing energy from the circuit in its electric field, while when the voltage is decreasing, the current is directed out of the positive terminal, so it is acting as a source, returning stored energy to the circuit. In a steady-state AC circuit, all the energy stored in reactances is returned within the AC cycle, so a pure reactance, a capacitor or inductor, neither consumes nor produces net power, neither a source nor a load.

=== Reference directions ===
The power flow p and resistance r of an electrical component are related to the voltage v and current i variables by the defining equation for power and Ohm's law:

$$p = vi \qquad\qquad\qquad\,\,\, (1) \,$$

$$r = {v \over i} \qquad\qquad\qquad \,\, (2)  \,$$

Like power, voltage and current are signed quantities. The current flow in a wire has two possible directions, so when defining a current variable i the direction which represents positive current flow must be indicated, usually by an arrow on the circuit diagram. This is called the reference direction for current i. If the actual current is in the opposite direction, the variable i will have a negative value.

Similarly in defining a variable v representing the voltage between two terminals, the terminal which is positive when the voltage is positive must be specified, usually with a plus sign. This is called the reference direction or reference terminal for voltage v. If the terminal marked positive actually has a lower voltage than the other one, then the variable v will have a negative value.

To understand the passive sign convention, it is important to distinguish the reference directions of the variables, v and i, which can be assigned at will, from the direction of the actual voltage and current, which is determined by the circuit. The idea of the PSC is that by assigning the reference direction of variables v and i in a component with the right relationship, the power flow in passive components calculated from Eq. (1) will come out positive, while the power flow in active components will come out negative. It is unnecessary to know whether a component produces or consumes power when analyzing the circuit; reference directions can be assigned arbitrarily, directions to currents and polarities to voltages, then the PSC is used to calculate the power in components. If the power comes out positive, the component is a load, consuming electric energy and converting it to some other kind of energy. If the power comes out negative, the component is a source, converting some other form of energy to electric energy.

=== Sign conventions ===
The above discussion shows that choosing the reference directions of the voltage and current variables in a component determines the direction of power flow that is considered positive. The reference directions of the individual variables are not important, only their relation to each other. There are two choices:

- Passive sign convention: the reference direction of the current variable (the arrow representing the direction of positive current) points into the positive reference terminal of the voltage variable. This means that if the voltage and current variables have positive values, current flows through the device from the positive to the negative terminal, doing work on the component, as occurs in a passive component. So power flowing into the component from the line is defined as positive; the power variable represents power dissipation in the component. Therefore
  - Active components (power sources) will have negative resistance and negative power flow
  - Passive components (loads) will have positive resistance and positive power flow

This is the convention normally used.

- Active sign convention: the reference direction of the current variable (the arrow representing the direction of positive current) points into the negative reference terminal of the voltage variable. This means that if the voltage and current variables have positive values, current flows through the device from the negative to the positive terminal, so work is being done on the current, and power flows out of the component. So power flowing out of the component is defined as positive; the power variable represents power produced. Therefore:
  - Active components will have positive resistance and positive power flow
  - Passive components will have negative resistance and negative power flow

This convention is rarely used, except for special cases in power engineering.

In practice, assigning the voltage and current variables in a circuit is not necessary to comply with the PSC. Components in which the variables have a "backward" relationship, in which the current variable enters the negative terminal, can still be made to comply with the PSC by changing the sign of the constitutive relations (1) and (2) used with them. A current entering the negative terminal is equivalent to a negative current entering the positive terminal, so in such a component

$p = v(-i) = -vi \,$, and

$$r = v/(-i) = -v/i \,$$

== Conservation of energy ==
One advantage of defining all the variables in a circuit to comply with the PSC is that it makes it easy to express conservation of energy. Since electric energy cannot be created or destroyed at any given instant, every watt of power consumed by a load component must be produced by some source component in the circuit. Therefore the sum of all the power consumed by loads equals the sum of all the power produced by sources. Since with the PSC, the power dissipation in sources is negative, and power dissipation in loads is positive, the algebraic sum of all the power dissipation in all the components in a circuit is always zero

$$\sum_n p_n = \sum_n v_n i_n = 0 \,$$

== AC circuits ==
Since the sign convention only deals with the directions of the variables and not with the direction of the actual current, it also applies to alternating current (AC) circuits, in which the direction of the voltage and current periodically reverses. In an AC circuit, even though the voltage and current reverse direction during the second half of the cycle, at any given instant, it obeys the PSC: in passive components, the instantaneous current flows through the device from the positive to the negative terminal, while in active components it flows through the component from the negative to the positive terminal. In nonreactive circuits, since power is the product of voltage and current, and both the voltage and the current reverse direction, the two sign reversals cancel each other. The sign of the power flow is unchanged in both halves of the cycle.

In loads with reactance, the voltage and current are not in phase. The load also temporarily stores some energy that is returned to the circuit each cycle, so the instantaneous direction of power flow reverses during parts of the cycle. However, the average power still obeys the passive sign convention. The average power dissipation over a cycle is $P = IV\cos{\theta}$, where $V$ is the voltage amplitude, $I$ is the current amplitude and $\theta$ is the phase angle between them. If the load has resistance, the phase angle $\theta$ is between +90° and −90°, so the average power is positive.

== Alternative convention in power engineering ==
In practice, the power output of power sources such as batteries and generators is not given in negative numbers, as required by the passive sign convention. No manufacturer sells a "−5 kilowatt generator". The standard practice in electric power circuits is to use positive values for the power of power sources, as well as loads. This avoids confusion over the meaning of "negative power". In order to make the power for both sources and loads come out positive, instead of the passive sign convention, separate sign conventions must be used for sources and loads. These are called the "generator-load conventions" which are used in electric power engineering

- Generator convention - In source components like generators and batteries, the variables V and I are defined according to the active sign convention above; the current variable is defined as entering the negative terminal of the device.
- Load convention - In loads, the variables are defined according to the normal passive sign convention; the current variable is defined as entering the positive terminal.

Using this convention, positive power flow in source components is power produced, while positive power flow in load components is power consumed. As with the PSC, if the variables in a given component do not conform to the applicable convention, the component can still be made to conform by using negative signs in the constitutive equations (1) and (2)

$P = -VI \,$ and $R = -V/I \,$

This convention may seem preferable to the passive sign convention, since the power P and resistance R always have positive values. However, it cannot be used in electronics because it is not possible to classify some electronic components unambiguously as "sources" or "loads". Some electronic components may act as sources of power with negative resistance in some portions of their operating range, and as absorbers of power with positive resistance in other portions, or even in different portions of the AC cycle. The power consumption or production of a component depends on its current–voltage characteristic curve. Whether the component acts as a source or load may depend on the current i or voltage v in it, which is not known until the circuit is analyzed. For example, if the voltage across a rechargeable battery's terminals is less than its open-circuit voltage, it will act as a source, while if the voltage is greater it will act as a load and recharge. So it is necessary for power and resistance variables to be able to take on both positive and negative values.
