= BARITT diode =

High frequency semiconductor

The BARITT diode (barrier injection transit-time) is a high frequency semiconductor component of microelectronics. A related component is the DOVETT diode. The BARITT diode uses injection and transit-time properties of minority carriers to produce a negative resistance at microwave frequencies. About the biased forward boundary layer, the minority carriers are injected. There is no avalanche breakdown instead. Consequently, both the phase shift and the output power is substantially lower than in an IMPATT diode.
