= Chen Guanrong =

Chinese scholar

Guanrong Chen
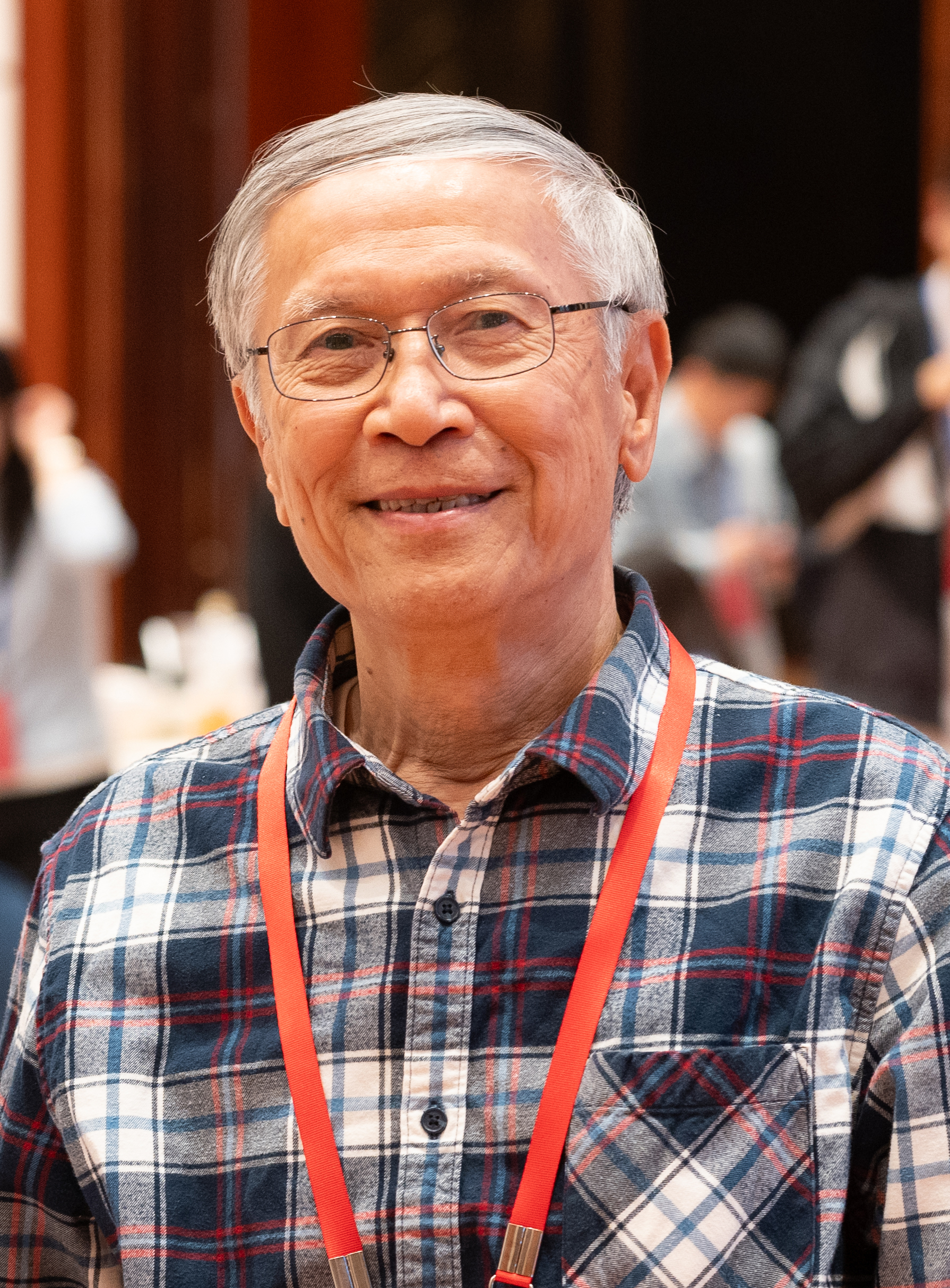
- Chen in 2025
- Born: 1948 (age 77–78); Guangzhou, China
- Education: Sun Yat-sen University; Texas A&M University
- Known for: Chen attractor Lu Chen attractor Multiscroll attractor
- Scientific career
- Fields: Nonlinear Systems; Complex Networks; Chaos Theory
- Workplaces: Rice University; University of Houston; City University of Hong Kong
- Doctoral advisor: Charles K. Chui
- Doctoral students: Jinhu Lu
- Website: City University of Hong Kong — Guanrong Chen

Guanrong Chen (陈关荣) or Ron Chen is a Chinese mathematician who made contributions to Chaos theory. He has been the chair professor and the founding director of the Centre for Chaos and Complex Networks at the City University of Hong Kong since 2000. Prior to that, he was a tenured full professor at the University of Houston, Texas. Chen was elected Member of the Academy of Europe in 2014, elected Fellow of The World Academy of Sciences in 2015, and elected IEEE Fellow in 1997. He is currently the editor-in-chief for the International Journal of Bifurcation and Chaos.

He is known for his contributions to Chaos theory and Bifurcation theory, including the Chen attractor, a kind of dynamical system attractor named after him (see Multiscroll attractor).

== Early life ==
In 1948, Chen Guanrong was born in Guangzhou, China. In 1978, he enrolled in the Guangzhou Sun Yat-sen University. In 1981 he graduated with a master's degree in computational mathematics.

He then studied in the US and in 1987 earned a PhD in applied math from Texas A&M University.

== Academia ==
From 1987 to 1990 he worked as a professor at Rice University. From 1990 to 1999 he worked at University of Houston and became a full tenured professor.

In 2000, he became a chair professor at the City University of Hong Kong, founding the Centre for Chaos and Complex Networks.

He conducts research on chaos, control theory, bifurcations, nonlinear dynamics, complex systems, etc.

=== IEEE ===
From 1999 to 2001, he served as the chairman for the IEEE Nonlinear Circuits and Systems Technical Committee. Since 2008, he has served as Editor in Chief of IEEE Circuits and Systems Magazine.

Since 2010, he has served as Editor in Chief of International Journal of Bifurcation and Chaos. Before, from 1991 to 2009, he was editor for the International Journal of Bifurcation and Chaos. From 2004 to 2007, he was Deputy Editor-in-Chief for the IEEE Transactions on Circuits and Systems. From 2004 to 2005, he was an editor for the IEEE Transactions on Automatic Control.

=== Journals and conferences ===
From 2008 to 2009, he was Deputy Editor-in-Chief and associate editor for the International Journal of Circuit Theory and Applications.

From 2006 to 2008, he was editor for the Journal of Control Science and Engineering.

Since 1995, he has been editor for the Chinese Academy of Sciences Journal on Control Theory and Applications.

From 2001 to 2014, he was editor for the Journal of Systems Science and Complexity.

From 2009 to 2014, he served as the chairman for the Chinese Society's Complex Systems and Networks Committee.

== Research ==
He is known for the Chen attractor, Lu Chen attractor, and other works on Multiscroll attractors. He conducts research on chaos, control theory, bifurcations, nonlinear dynamics, complex systems, etc.

=== Chen attractor ===
Chen discovered the Chen equations, a system of coupled differential equations that produce the Chen's attractor, a type of Lorenz attractor.

The equations that govern the Chen system are:

$$\frac{dx}{dt} = a (y - x)$$

$$\frac{dy}{dt} = (c- a)x - xz+cy$$

$$\frac{dz}{dt} = xy - bz$$

where $a=35, b=3, c=28$.

== Publications ==
Chen Guanrong has published over 650 papers and over 300 abstracts on chaos theory and related fields. He currently has over 60,000 citations, making him one of the most cited leaders in the field.

- Chen G., Ueta T. Yet another chaotic attractor. Journal of Bifurcation and Chaos, 1999 9:1465.
- Chen, Guanrong; Jinhu Lu (2006). "GENERATING MULTISCROLL CHAOTIC ATTRACTORS: THEORIES, METHODS AND APPLICATIONS" (PDF). International Journal of Bifurcation and Chaos.
- Fangyue Chen, Guolong He, Xiubin Xu, and Guanrong Chen, "Implementation of Arbitrary Boolean Functions via CNN" (a paper on Cellular neural networks).

Books

- Kalman Filtering with Real-Time Applications
- Linear Systems and Optimal Control
- Hopf Bifurcation Analysis: A Frequency Domain Approach
- From Chaos to Order: Methodologies, Perspectives and Applications
- Dynamics of the Lorenz System Family: Analysis, Control and Synchronization
- Complex Networks: Models, Dynamics and Control
- Integration of Fuzzy Logic and Chaos Theory
- Evolutionary Algorithms and Chaotic Systems

== Awards and honors ==
- IEEE Fellow (1997)
- Honorary Doctorate of University of Le Havre, Normandy, France (2014)
- Honorary Doctorate (Doctoris Honoris Causa) of Saint Petersburg State University, Russia (2011)
- Euler Gold Medal (2011)
- SCI Highly Cited Researcher in Engineering, Thomson Reuters (since November 2009)
- Harden-Simons Annual Prize for Outstanding Journal Paper, American Society of Engineering Education (1998)
- Best Paper Award (2002), Institute of Information Theory and Automation, Academy of Sciences of the Czech Republic
- IEEE M. Barry Carlton Best Annual Paper Award, IEEE Aerospace and Electronic Systems Society (2001)
- IEEE Guillemin-Cauer Best Annual Paper Award, IEEE Circuits and Systems Society (2005)
- IET Premium Best Paper Award (2013)
- State Natural Science Award, China (2008, 2012, 2016)
- President's Award of City University of Hong Kong (2019)
- Ho-Leung-Ho-Lee Science and Technology Award (2010)
- Junior Faculty Research Excellence Award, University of Houston (1993)

=== Honorary professorships ===
Chen Guanrong has given lectures in more than 30 countries and holds honorary professor positions in many universities around the world, including but not limited to:

- Central Queensland University, Australia;
- University of Ballarat, Australia;
- Universidad Nacional del Sur, Argentina;
- Chang-Jiang Chair Professor of Peking University;
- Fudan University;
- Tsinghua University;
- University of Science and Technology of China;
- Shanghai Jiao Tong University;
- Sun Yat-sen University;
- Tianjin University;
- Zhejiang University

== See also ==
- Multiscroll attractor
