= International Journal of Bifurcation and Chaos in Applied Sciences and Engineering =

- Discipline: Nonlinear dynamics, chaos theory
- Language: English
- Edited by: Guanrong Chen

Publication details
- History: 1991–present
- Publisher: World Scientific
- Impact factor: 2.836 (2020)

Standard abbreviations
- ISO 4: Int. J. Bifurc. Chaos Appl. Sci. Eng.
- MathSciNet: Internat. J. Bifur. Chaos Appl. Sci. Engrg.

Indexing
- ISSN: 0218-1274 (print); 1793-6551 (web)
- OCLC no.: 23477115

Links
- Journal homepage

International Journal of Bifurcation and Chaos in Applied Sciences and Engineering (often abbreviated as IJBC) is a peer-reviewed scientific journal published by World Scientific. It was established in 1991 and covers chaos theory and nonlinear science in a diverse range of fields in applied science and engineering.

== Abstracting and indexing ==
According to the Journal Citation Reports, the journal had an impact factor of 2.836 in 2020. The journal is abstracted and indexed in:

- Science Citation Index
- Current Contents Physical, Chemical and Earth Sciences
- CompuMath Citation Index
- Science Citation Index Expanded (also known as SciSearch)
- ISI Alerting Services
- Mathematical Reviews
- INSPEC
- Zentralblatt MATH
