= IMPATT diode =

Type of high-power semiconductor diode

An IMPATT diode (impact ionization avalanche transit-time diode) is a form of high-power semiconductor diode used in high-frequency microwave electronics devices. They have negative resistance and are used as oscillators and amplifiers at microwave frequencies. They operate at frequencies of about 3 and 100 GHz, or higher. The main advantage is their high-power capability; single IMPATT diodes can produce continuous microwave outputs of up to 3 kilowatts, and pulsed outputs of much higher power. These diodes are used in a variety of applications from low-power radar systems to proximity alarms. A major drawback of IMPATT diodes is the high level of phase noise they generate. This results from the statistical nature of the avalanche process.

== Device structure ==
The IMPATT diode family includes many different junctions and metal semiconductor devices. The first IMPATT oscillation was obtained from a simple silicon p–n junction diode biased into a reverse avalanche break down and mounted in a microwave cavity. Because of the strong dependence of the ionization coefficient on the electric field, most of the electron–hole pairs are generated in the high field region. The generated electron immediately moves into the N region, while the generated holes drift across the P region. The time required for the hole to reach the contact constitutes the transit time delay.

The original proposal for a microwave device of the IMPATT type was made by Read. The Read diode consists of two regions (1) the avalanche region (a region with relatively high doping and high field) in which avalanche multiplication occurs and (2) the drift region (a region with essentially intrinsic doping and constant field) in which the generated holes drift towards the contact. A similar device can be built with the configuration in which electrons generated from the avalanche multiplication drift through the intrinsic region.

An IMPATT diode generally is mounted in a microwave package. The diode is mounted with its low–field region close to a silicon heat sink so that the heat generated at the diode junction can be readily dissipated. Similar microwave packages are used to house other microwave devices.

The IMPATT diode operates over a narrow frequency band, and diode internal dimensions must correlate with the desired operating frequency. An IMPATT oscillator can be tuned by adjusting the resonant frequency of the coupled circuit, and also by varying the current in the diode; this can be used for frequency modulation.

== Principle of operation ==
If a free electron with a sufficient energy strikes a silicon atom, it can break the covalent bond of silicon and liberate an electron from the covalent bond. If the electron liberated gains energy by being in an electric field and liberates other electrons from other covalent bonds then this process can cascade very quickly into a chain reaction, producing a large number of electrons and a large current flow. This phenomenon is called avalanche breakdown.

At breakdown, the n– region is punched through and forms the avalanche region of the diode. The high resistivity region is the drift zone through which the avalanche generated electrons move toward the anode.

Consider a dc bias V_{B}, just short of that required to cause breakdown, applied to the diode. Let an AC voltage of sufficiently large magnitude be superimposed on the dc bias, such that during the positive cycle of the AC voltage, the diode is driven deep into the avalanche breakdown. At t=0, the AC voltage is zero, and only a small pre-breakdown current flows through the diode. As t increases, the voltage goes above the breakdown voltage and secondary electron-hole pairs are produced by impact ionization. As long as the field in the avalanche region is maintained above the breakdown field, the electron-hole concentration grows exponentially with t. Similarly this concentration decays exponentially with time when the field is reduced below breakdown voltage during the negative swing of the AC voltage. The holes generated in the avalanche region disappear in the p+ region and are collected by the cathode. The electrons are injected into the i – zone where they drift toward the n+ region. Then, the field in the avalanche region reaches its maximum value and the population of the electron-hole pairs starts building up. At this time, the ionization coefficients have their maximum values. The generated electron concentration does not follow the electric field instantaneously because it also depends on the number of electron-hole pairs already present in the avalanche region. Hence, the electron concentration at this point will have a small value. Even after the field has passed its maximum value, the electron-hole concentration continues to grow because the secondary carrier generation rate still remains above its average value. For this reason, the electron concentration in the avalanche region attains its maximum value when the field has dropped to its average value. Thus, it is clear that the avalanche region introduces a 90° phase shift between the AC signal and the electron concentration in this region.

With a further increase in t, the AC voltage becomes negative, and the field in the avalanche region drops below its critical value. The electrons in the avalanche region are then injected into the drift zone which induces a current in the external circuit which has a phase opposite to that of the AC voltage. The AC field, therefore, absorbs energy from the drifting electrons as they are decelerated by the decreasing field. It is clear that an ideal phase shift between the diode current and the AC signal is achieved if the thickness of the drift zone is such that the bunch of electron is collected at the n^{+} – anode at the moment the AC voltage goes to zero. This condition is achieved by making the length of the drift region equal to the wavelength of the signal. This situation produces an additional phase shift of 90° between the AC voltage and the diode current.

== Origins ==
In 1956 W. T. Read and Ralph L. Johnston of Bell Telephone Laboratories proposed that an avalanche diode that exhibited significant transit time delay might exhibit a negative resistance characteristic. The effect was soon demonstrated in ordinary silicon diodes and by the late 1960s oscillators at 340 GHz had been produced. Silicon IMPATT diodes can produce up to 3 kilowatts of power continuously, with higher power available in pulses.

== TRAPATT ==
A microwave oscillator device with a similar structure to the IMPATT diode is the TRAPATT diode, which stands for "trapped plasma avalanche triggered transit". This mode of operation produces relatively high power and efficiency, but at lower frequency than a device operated in IMPATT mode.

== See also ==
- BARITT diode
- Gunn diode
- Tunnel diode
