= Current–voltage characteristic =

Current output as a function of applied voltage for a material or device

The current–voltage characteristics of four devices: a resistor with large resistance, a resistor with small resistance, a P–N junction diode, and a battery with nonzero internal resistance. The horizontal axis represents the voltage drop, the vertical axis the current. All four plots use the passive sign convention.

A current–voltage characteristic or I–V curve (current–voltage curve) is a relationship, typically represented as a chart or graph, between the electric current through a circuit, device, or material, and the corresponding voltage, or potential difference, across it.

== In electronics ==
MOSFET drain current vs. drain-to-source voltage for several values of the overdrive voltage, $V_{GS}-V_{th}$; the boundary between linear (ohmic) and saturation (active) modes is indicated by the upward curving parabola.

In electronics, the relationship between the direct current (DC) through an electronic device and the DC voltage across its terminals is called a current–voltage characteristic of the device. Electronic engineers use these charts to determine basic parameters of a device and to model its behavior in an electrical circuit. These characteristics are also known as I–V curves, referring to the standard symbols for current and voltage.

In electronic components with more than two terminals, such as vacuum tubes and transistors, the current–voltage relationship at one pair of terminals may depend on the current or voltage on a third terminal. This is usually displayed on a more complex current–voltage graph with multiple curves, each one representing the current–voltage relationship at a different value of current or voltage on the third terminal.

For example the diagram at right shows a family of I–V curves for a MOSFET as a function of drain voltage with overvoltage (V_{GS} − V_{th}) as a parameter.

The simplest I–V curve is that of a resistor, which according to Ohm's law exhibits a linear relationship between the applied voltage and the resulting electric current; the current is proportional to the voltage, so the I–V curve is a straight line through the origin with positive slope. The reciprocal of the slope is equal to the resistance.

The I–V curve of an electrical component can be measured with an instrument called a curve tracer. The transconductance and Early voltage of a transistor are examples of parameters traditionally measured from the device's I–V curve.

=== Types of I–V curves ===
The shape of an electrical component's characteristic curve reveals much about its operating properties. I–V curves of different devices can be grouped into categories:

The quadrants of the I–V plane. Power sources have curves passing through the red regions.

- Active vs passive: Devices which have I–V curves which are limited to the first and third quadrants of the I–V plane, passing through the origin, are passive components (loads), that consume electric power from the circuit. Examples are resistors, light bulbs and electric motors. Conventional current always flows through these devices in the direction of the electric field, from the positive voltage terminal to the negative, so the charges lose potential energy in the device, which is converted to heat or some other form of energy.

In contrast, devices with I–V curves which pass through the second or fourth quadrants are active components, power sources, which can produce electric power. Examples are batteries and generators. When it is operating in the second or fourth quadrant, current is forced to flow through the device from the negative to the positive voltage terminal, against the opposing force of the electric field, so the electric charges are gaining potential energy. Thus the device is converting some other form of energy into electric energy.

- Linear vs nonlinear: A straight line through the origin represents a linear circuit element, while a curved line represents a nonlinear element. For example, resistors, capacitors, and inductors are linear, while diodes and transistors are nonlinear. An I–V curve which is a straight line through the origin with positive slope represents a linear or ohmic resistor, the most common type of resistance encountered in circuits. It obeys Ohm's law; the current is proportional to the applied voltage over a wide range. Its resistance, equal to the reciprocal of the slope of the line, is constant. A curved I–V line represents a nonlinear resistance, such as a diode. In this type the resistance varies with the applied voltage or current.
- Negative resistance vs positive resistance: If the I–V curve has a positive slope (increasing to the right) throughout, it represents a positive resistance. An I–V curve that is nonmonotonic (having peaks and valleys) represents a device which has negative resistance. Regions of the curve which have a negative slope (declining to the right) represent operating regions where the device has negative differential resistance, while regions of positive slope represent positive differential resistance. Negative resistance devices can be used to make amplifiers and oscillators. Tunnel diodes and Gunn diodes are examples of components that have negative resistance.
- Hysteresis vs single-valued: Devices which have hysteresis; that is, in which the current–voltage relation depends not only on the present applied input but also on the past history of inputs, have I–V curves consisting of families of closed loops. Each branch of the loop is marked with a direction represented by an arrow. Examples of devices with hysteresis include iron-core inductors and transformers, thyristors such as SCRs and DIACs, and gas-discharge tubes such as neon lights.
I–V curve similar to a tunnel diode characteristic curve. It has negative resistance in the shaded voltage region, between v_{1} and v_{2}

DIAC I–V curve. V_{BO} is the breakover voltage.

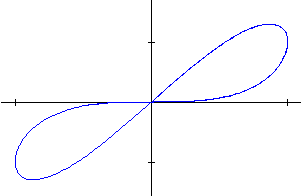
Memristor I–V curve, showing a pinched hysteresis

Gunn diode I–V curve, showing negative differential resistance with hysteresis (notice arrows)

== In electrophysiology ==
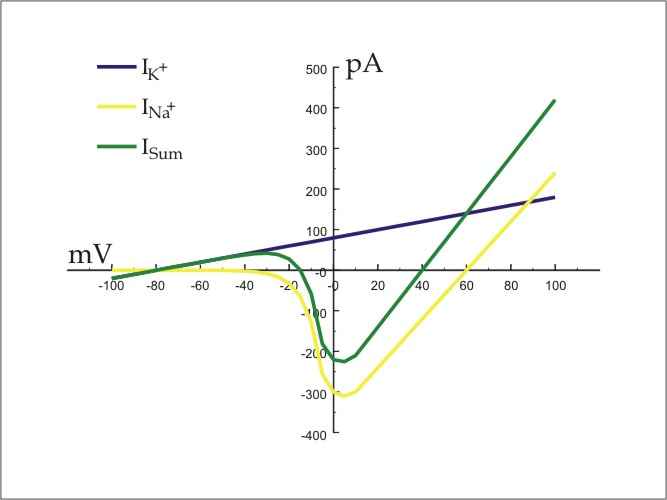
An approximation of the potassium and sodium ion components of a so-called "whole cell" I–V curve of a neuron.

While I–V curves are applicable to any electrical system, they find wide use in the field of biological electricity, particularly in the sub-field of electrophysiology. In this case, the voltage refers to the voltage across a biological membrane, a membrane potential, and the current is the flow of charged ions through channels in this membrane. The current is determined by the conductances of these channels.

In the case of ionic current across biological membranes, currents are measured from inside to outside. That is, positive currents, known as "outward current", corresponding to positively charged ions crossing a cell membrane from the inside to the outside, or a negatively charged ion crossing from the outside to the inside. Similarly, currents with a negative value are referred to as "inward current", corresponding to positively charged ions crossing a cell membrane from the outside to the inside, or a negatively charged ion crossing from inside to outside.

The figure to the right shows an I–V curve that is more relevant to the currents in excitable biological membranes (such as a neuronal axon). The blue line shows the I–V relationship for the potassium ion. It is linear, indicating no voltage-dependent gating of the potassium ion channel. The yellow line shows the I–V relationship for the sodium ion. It is not linear, indicating that the sodium ion channel is voltage-dependent. The green line indicates the I–V relationship derived from summing the sodium and potassium currents. This approximates the actual membrane potential and current relationship of a cell containing both types of channel.

== See also ==
- Maximum power point tracking
- Voltammetry
