= Chua's diode =

Electronic resistor

Current-voltage characteristic of Chua's diode

In electronics and chaos theory, Chua's diode is a type of two-terminal, nonlinear active resistor which can be described with piecewise-linear equations. It is an essential part of Chua's circuit, a simple electronic oscillator circuit which exhibits chaotic oscillations and is widely used as an example for a chaotic system. It is implemented as a voltage-controlled, nonlinear negative resistor.

The diode is not sold commercially, and is usually built from standard circuit components such as diodes, capacitors, resistors and op-amps. There are multiple ways to simulate Chua's diode using such components. One standard design is realized by connecting two negative impedance converters in parallel. A negative impedance converter (NIC) is a simple op amp circuit that has negative resistance. Another implementation uses one negative impedance converter to create the negative resistance characteristic, and a diode-resistor network to create the nonlinear characteristic.

Chua's diode was invented by Leon Chua, who is also the inventor of Chua's circuit.
