= Jinhu Lu =

Chinese electrical engineer

Jinhu Lu is an electrical engineer at the Chinese Academy of Sciences in Beijing. Lu was named a Fellow of the Institute of Electrical and Electronics Engineers (IEEE) in 2013 for his contributions to complex networks and nonlinear circuits and systems.

Lu received a PhD in applied math from the Chinese Academy of Sciences in 2002.
