= Autonomous circuit =

Circuit that produces time-varying output without having a time-varying input

An autonomous circuit in analogue electronics is a circuit that produces a time-varying output without having a time-varying input (i.e., it has only DC power as an input). In digital electronics, an autonomous circuit may have a clock signal input, but no other inputs, and operates autonomously (i.e. independently of other circuits), cycling through a set series of states. A Moore machine is autonomous if it has no data inputs, the clock signal not counting as a data input. If a Moore machine has data inputs, they may determine what the next state is, even though they do not affect the outputs of any given state, and this is a non-autonomous circuit.

== Citations ==
- Mehrotra, Amit; Sangiovanni-Vincentelli, Alberto L. (2013). Noise Analysis of Radio Frequency Circuits. Springer Science & Business Media. ISBN 9781475760071.
- Crowe, J.; Hayes-Gill, Barrie (1998). "Synchronous sequential circuits". Introduction to Digital Electronics. Elsevier. p. 180. ISBN 9780080534992.
- Cavanagh, Joseph (2017). "Sequential logic". Digital Design and Verilog HDL Fundamentals. CRC Press. ISBN 9781420074161.
- Bannister, B. R.; Whitehead, Donald Gill (1987). "Sequential logic analysis and design". Fundamentals of Modern Digital Systems. Macmillan International Higher Education. ISBN 9781349188581.
- Suárez, Almudena (2009). Analysis and design of autonomous microwave circuits. Hoboken, N.J.: Wiley. ISBN 978-0-470-05074-3.
