= Unibit =

Unibit may refer to:

- Unibit (drill bit), a roughly conical drill bit with a stairstep profile
- Unibit (unit), 1 bit of information
- Unibit PLL, a type of phase-locked loop (PLL)
- Unibit (font), an opensource Chinese font containing Chinese, Japanese, and Korean languages ideographs
