= FLL (disambiguation) =

FLL may refer to:

- FIRST Lego League (disambiguation)
- Fort Lauderdale–Hollywood International Airport, in Florida, United States
- Four Letter Lie, an American post-hardcore band
- Frequency-locked loop
- Lebanese Liberation Front (French: Front de Liberation Libanais)
