= William F. Egan =

Author

William F. Egan (1936 – December 16, 2012) was well-known expert and author in the area of PLLs. The first and second editions of his book Frequency Synthesis by Phase Lock as well as his book Phase-Lock Basics are references among electrical engineers specializing in areas involving PLLs.

== Egan's conjecture on the pull-in range of type II APLL ==
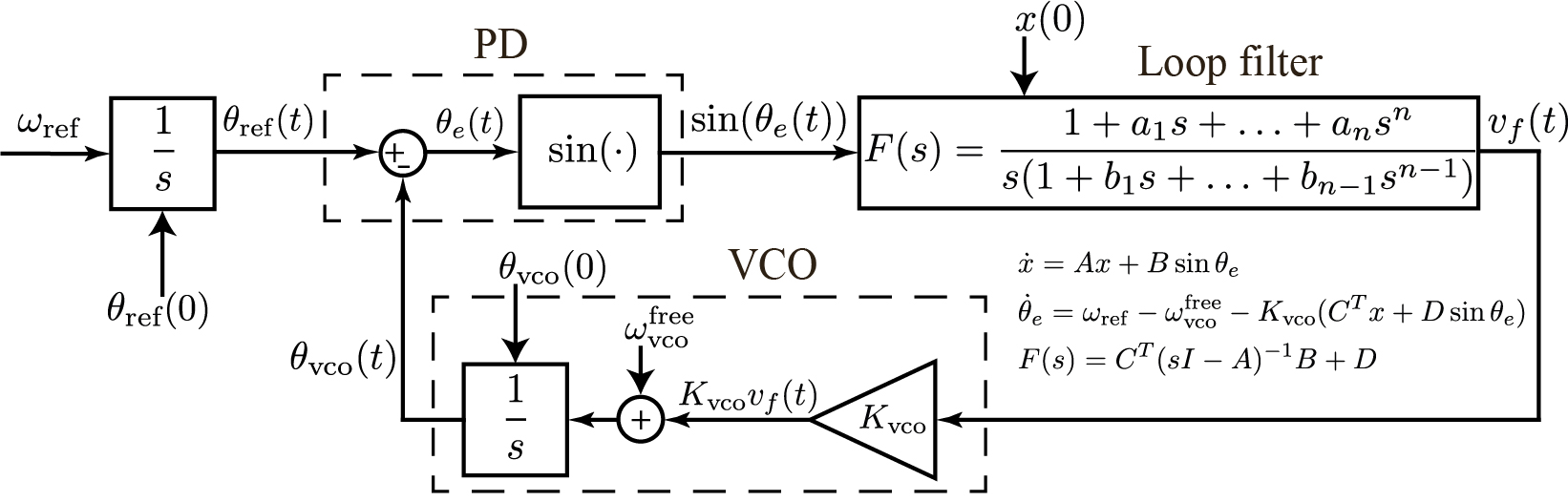
Baseband model of a type II APLL and its closed-form dynamic model

In 1981, describing the high-order PLL, William Egan conjectured that type II APLL has theoretically infinite the hold-in and pull-in ranges. From a mathematical point of view, that means that the loss of global stability in type II APLL is caused by the birth of self-excited oscillations and not hidden oscillations (i.e., the boundary of global stability and the pull-in range in the space of parameters is trivial). The conjecture can be found in various later publications, see e.g. and for type II CP-PLL. The hold-in and pull-in ranges of type II APLL for a given parameters may be either (theoretically) infinite or empty, thus, since the pull-in range is a subrange of the hold-in range, the question is whether the infinite hold-in range implies infinite pull-in range (the Egan problem). Although it is known that for the second-order type II APLL the conjecture is valid, the work by Kuznetsov et al. shows that the Egan conjecture may be not valid in some cases.

A similar statement for the second-order APLL with lead-lag filter arises in Kapranov's conjecture on the pull-in range and Viterbi's problem on the APLL ranges coincidence. In general, Kapranov's conjecture is not valid and the global stability and the pull-in range for the type I APLL with lead-lag filters may be limited by the birth of hidden oscillations (hidden boundary of the global stability and the pull-in range). For control systems, a similar conjecture was formulated by R. Kalman in 1957 (see Kalman's conjecture).
