= Automatic frequency control =

Radio circuit

Basic automatic frequency control in a radio receiver. У = RF amplifier stages, Д = frequency discriminator stage

In radio equipment, Automatic Frequency Control (AFC), also called Automatic Fine Tuning (AFT), is a method or circuit to automatically keep a resonant circuit tuned to the frequency of an incoming radio signal. It is primarily used in radio receivers to keep the receiver tuned to the frequency of the desired station.

In radio communication, AFC is needed because, after the bandpass frequency of a receiver is tuned to the frequency of a transmitter, the two frequencies may drift apart, interrupting the reception. This can be caused by a poorly controlled transmitter frequency, but the most common cause is drift of the center bandpass frequency of the receiver, due to thermal or mechanical drift in the values of the electronic components.

Assuming that a receiver is nearly tuned to the desired frequency, the AFC circuit in the receiver develops an error voltage proportional to the degree to which the receiver is mistuned. This error voltage is then fed back to the tuning circuit in such a way that the tuning error is reduced. In most frequency modulation (FM) detectors, an error voltage of this type is easily available. See Negative feedback.

== Use ==
AFC was mainly used in radios and television sets around the mid-20th century. In the 1970s, receivers began to be designed using frequency synthesizer circuits, which synthesized the receiver's input frequency from a crystal oscillator using the vibrations of an ultra-stable quartz crystal. These maintained sufficiently stable frequencies that AFCs were no longer needed.

== See also ==
- Frequency drift
- Phase-locked loop (PLL)
- Automatic gain control (AGC)
