= Carrier recovery =

System in electronic signal processing

A carrier recovery system is a circuit used to estimate and compensate for frequency and phase differences between a received signal's carrier wave and the receiver's local oscillator for the purpose of coherent demodulation.

Example of QPSK carrier recovery phase error causing a fixed rotational offset of the received symbol constellation, X, relative to the intended constellation, O.

Example of QPSK carrier recovery frequency error causing rotation of the received symbol constellation, X, relative to the intended constellation, O.

In the transmitter of a communications carrier system, a carrier wave is modulated by a baseband signal. At the receiver, the baseband information is extracted from the incoming modulated waveform.

In an ideal communications system, the carrier signal oscillators of the transmitter and receiver would be perfectly matched in frequency and phase, thereby permitting perfect coherent demodulation of the modulated baseband signal.

However, transmitters and receivers rarely share the same carrier oscillator. Communications receiver systems are usually independent of transmitting systems and contain their oscillators with frequency and phase offsets and instabilities. Doppler shift may also contribute to frequency differences in mobile radio frequency communications systems.

All these frequencies and phase variations must be estimated using the information in the received signal to reproduce or recover the carrier signal at the receiver and permit coherent demodulation.

== Methods ==
For a quiet carrier or a signal containing a dominant carrier spectral line, carrier recovery can be accomplished with a simple band-pass filter at the carrier frequency or with a phase-locked loop, or both.

However, many modulation schemes make this simple approach impractical because most signal power is devoted to modulation—where the information is present—and not to the carrier frequency. Reducing the carrier power results in greater transmitter efficiency. Different methods must be employed to recover the carrier in these conditions.

=== Non-data-aided ===
Non-data-aided/“blind” carrier recovery methods do not rely on knowledge of the modulation symbols. They are typically used for simple carrier recovery schemes or as the initial coarse carrier frequency recovery method. Closed-loop non-data-aided systems are frequently maximum likelihood frequency error detectors.

==== Multiply-filter-divide ====
In this method of non-data-aided carrier recovery, a non-linear operation (frequency multiplier) is applied to the modulated signal to create harmonics of the carrier frequency with the modulation removed (see example below). The carrier harmonic is then band-pass filtered and frequency divided to recover the carrier frequency. (This may be followed by a PLL.) Multiply-filter-divide is an example of open-loop carrier recovery, which is favored in burst transactions (burst mode clock and data recovery) since the acquisition time is typically shorter than for close-loop synchronizers.

If the phase-offset/delay of the multiply-filter-divide system is known, it can be compensated for to recover the correct phase. In practice, applying this phase compensation is complicated.

In general, the modulation's order matches the nonlinear operator required to produce a clean carrier harmonic.

As an example, consider a BPSK signal. We can recover the RF carrier frequency, $\omega_{RF}$ by squaring:

$$\begin{align}
V_{BPSK}(t) &{}= A(t) \cos(\omega_{RF}t + n\pi); n = 0,1 \\
V^2_{BPSK}(t) &{}= A^2(t) \cos^2(\omega_{RF}t + n\pi) \\
V^2_{BPSK}(t) &{}= \frac{A^2(t)}{2}[1 + \cos(2\omega_{RF}t + n2{\pi})]
\end{align}$$

This produces a signal at twice the RF carrier frequency with no phase modulation (modulo $2\pi$ phase is effectively 0 modulation)

For a QPSK signal, we can take the fourth power:

$$\begin{align}
V_{QPSK}(t) &{}= A(t) \cos(\omega_{RF}t + n\frac{\pi}{2}); n = 0,1,2,3 \\
V^4_{QPSK}(t) &{}= A^4(t) \cos^4(\omega_{RF}t + n\frac{\pi}{2}) \\
V^4_{QPSK}(t) &{}= \frac{A^4(t)}{8}[3 + 4\cos(2\omega_{RF}t + n{\pi}) + \cos(4\omega_{RF}t + n2\pi)]
\end{align}$$

Two terms (plus a DC component) are produced. An appropriate filter around $4\omega_{RF}$ recovers this frequency.

==== Costas loop ====
The carrier frequency and phase recovery, as well as demodulation, can be accomplished using a Costas loop of the appropriate order. A Costas loop is a cousin of the PLL that uses coherent quadrature signals to measure phase error. This phase error is used to discipline the loop's oscillator. Once correctly aligned/recovered, the quadrature signals also successfully demodulate the signal. Costas loop carrier recovery may be used for any M-ary PSK modulation scheme. One of the Costas Loop's inherent shortcomings is a 360/M degree phase ambiguity present on the demodulated output.

=== Decision-directed ===
At the start of the carrier recovery process, it is possible to achieve symbol synchronization before full carrier recovery because symbol timing can be determined without knowledge of the carrier phase or the carrier's minor frequency variation/offset. In decision directed carrier recovery the output of a symbol decoder is fed to a comparison circuit and the phase difference/error between the decoded symbol and the received signal is used to discipline the local oscillator. Decision-directed methods are suited to synchronizing frequency differences that are less than the symbol rate because comparisons are performed on symbols at or near the symbol rate. Other frequency recovery methods may be necessary to achieve initial frequency acquisition.

A common form of decision-directed carrier recovery begins with quadrature phase correlators producing in-phase and quadrature signals representing a symbol coordinate in the complex plane. This point should correspond to a location in the modulation constellation diagram. The phase error between the received value and nearest/decoded symbol is calculated using arc tangent (or an approximation). However, arc tangent, can only compute a phase correction between 0 and $\pi/2$. Most QAM constellations also have $\pi/2$ phase symmetry. Both of these shortcomings came be overcome by using differential coding.

In low SNR conditions, the symbol decoder will make errors more frequently. Exclusively using the corner symbols in rectangular constellations or giving them more weight versus lower SNR symbols reduces the impact of low SNR decision errors.

== See also ==
- Clock recovery
- Phase detector
- Phase retrieval
