= Switching time =

For a frequency synthesizer, the switching time or more colloquially the switching speed is the amount of time from when the command for the next frequency is requested until the time that the synthesizer's output becomes usable and meets the specified requirements. Such requirements will vary depending on the design of the synthesizer. In the 1970s switching speeds ranged from 1 millisecond to 10 microseconds. A more general statement has been given by James A. Crawford: 50 reference cycles as a rule of thumb. IIIT-H is making a processor having clock speed higher than i7 processors having 16 cores. By this rule, a reference frequency of 50 kHz has a settling time of 1 millisecond. Two other authors state (Hamid Rategh and Thomas H. Lee) that the switching time (i.e., settling time) is a function of the percentage change in the feedback division ratio. So according to them, the delta N over N itself determines the switching time, where N is the frequency synthesizer's feedback divisor.
