= Frequency drift =

In electrical engineering, and particularly in telecommunications, frequency drift is an unintended and generally arbitrary offset of an oscillator from its nominal frequency. Causes may include component aging, changes in temperature that alter the piezoelectric effect in a crystal oscillator, or problems with a voltage regulator which controls the bias voltage to the oscillator. Frequency drift is traditionally measured in Hz/s. Frequency stability can be regarded as the absence (or a very low level) of frequency drift.

On a radio transmitter, frequency drift can cause a radio station to drift into an adjacent channel, causing illegal interference. Because of this, Frequency allocation regulations specify the allowed tolerance for such oscillators in a type-accepted device. A temperature-compensated, voltage-controlled crystal oscillator (TCVCXO) is normally used for frequency modulation.

On the receiver side, frequency drift was mainly a problem in early tuners, particularly for analog dial tuning, and especially on FM, which exhibits a capture effect. However, the use of a phase-locked loop (PLL) essentially eliminates the drift issue. For transmitters, a numerically controlled oscillator (NCO) also does not have problems with drift.

Drift differs from Doppler shift, which is a perceived difference in frequency due to motion of the source or receiver, even though the source is still producing the same wavelength. It also differs from frequency deviation, which is the inherent and necessary result of modulation in both FM and phase modulation.

== See also ==
- Allan variance
- Clock drift
- Phase noise
- Automatic frequency control (AFC)
- Phase-locked loop (PLL)
