= Cross-coupled LC oscillator =

Type of electronic oscillator

Schematic of a cross-coupled LC oscillator using n-MOSFETs (M_{1} and M_{2}) as differential transconductor

A cross-coupled LC oscillator is a type of electronic oscillator that employs a pair of cross-coupled electronic active devices—typically metal-oxide-semiconductor field-effect transistors (MOSFETs) or bipolar junction transistors (BJTs)—and a resonant LC filter, commonly referred to as a tank, that stores and exchanges energy between the inductor and the capacitor. The cross-coupled devices act as a differential transconductor to compensate for losses in the LC network and sustain autonomous oscillation.

This topology provides a differential output signal and is widely used to generate sinusoidal signals in the radio frequency (RF) range, from hundreds of megahertz up to hundreds of gigahertz, particularly in integrated circuits (ICs) that implement entire frequency synthesizers, transmitters, or receivers on a single semiconductor die. The classic cross-coupled design (pictured on the right) is characterized by low phase noise and low power dissipation, but has a limited frequency range (about 20%).

== Operating principle ==
A parallel LC circuit can naturally generate a sinusoidal signal at its resonance frequency:

$$\omega_0 = \frac{1}{\sqrt{LC}}$$

In an ideal lossless case, the oscillation would persist indefinitely. In practice, however, parasitic resistances in the reactive elements dissipate energy cycle after cycle, causing the amplitude to decay and the oscillation to eventually cease. Such losses can be represented by an equivalent resistance $R_0$ placed in parallel with the LC network. To maintain a stable oscillation over time, these losses must be offset by supplying energy to the resonator. A common approach is to place a transconductance element in a positive feedback configuration. In this topology, the transconductor senses the instantaneous voltage across the resonator and generates a current proportional to the transconductance G_{m}, injecting energy back into the tank.

Feedback model of an LC oscillator

For sustained oscillation to occur, two fundamental conditions must be satisfied—commonly referred to as the Barkhausen criteria—leading to the following conditions:

$$|G_\text{m} \cdot R_0(j\omega_\text{osc})| \geq 1$$
$$\omega_\text{osc}=\omega_0$$

These conditions ensure that the signal regenerates constructively at each cycle. In the start-up phase, the loop gain must be strictly greater than one to allow small perturbations, such as thermal noise, to grow. As the oscillation builds up, nonlinearities in the active device reduce the effective gain to unity, stabilizing the amplitude at a steady value.

=== MOSFET and bipolar based transconductor ===
Cross-coupled LC oscillator with current bias with MOSFET (left) and BJT (right) based transconductor

In integrated circuits, the most commonly used active devices for implementing the transconductance stage are MOSFETs and BJTs. In cross-coupled oscillators, at least two transistors are connected in a cross-coupled configuration to establish positive feedback, effectively generating a negative resistance that compensates for the tank losses. The equivalent transconductance at start-up is equal to g_{m}/2, where g_{m} is the transconductance of each transistor. For a MOSFET-based transconductor, g_{m} = 2I_{bias}/(V_{gs} − V_{t}), in which I_{bias} is the bias current, V_{gs} is the voltage between gate and source, and V_{t} the threshold voltage of the MOSFET. For a bipolar-based transconductor, g_{m} = I_{bias}/V_{thermal}, in which I_{bias} is the bias current, while V_{thermal} is the thermal voltage.

=== Phase noise ===
The phase noise of an LC oscillator can be described by a theoretical model first proposed by Leeson:

$$\mathcal{L}(\omega_\text{m}) =\frac{1}{2} \cdot \frac{kT}{R_0} \cdot \frac{(1+F)}{C^2 \omega_\text{m}^2 A_0^2 / 2}$$

where k is the Boltzmann constant, T is the absolute temperature in Kelvin, A_{0} is the differential oscillation amplitude across the tank, R_{0} models the tank losses, C is the tank capacitance, and ω_{m} is the frequency offset. The factor F, called the excess noise factor, accounts for the phase noise introduced by the transconductance stage and depends on the specific topology and technology used.

Leeson's model provides useful results but does not capture the mechanisms by which transistor electronic noise is converted into phase noise. To account for this, it is necessary to adopt approaches that consider the time-varying nature of the oscillator, such as the Impulse Sensitivity Function (ISF) method.

=== Figure of merit and efficiency ===
Phase noise is not the only figure of interest in an LC oscillator. The power consumption required to achieve a given phase noise level is also a critical parameter. A commonly used figure of merit (FoM) captures this trade-off and is expressed as:

$$\mathrm{FoM} = -10 \log_{10} \left[ \mathcal{L}(\omega_\text{m})P_{\mathrm{DC}} \left( \frac{\omega_\text{m}}{\omega_\text{osc}} \right)^2 \right]
= -10 \log_{10} \left( \frac{kT}{2} \right) + 10 \log_{10} Q^2
- 10 \log_{10} \left( \frac{1 + F}{\eta} \right)$$

where $\mathcal{L}(\omega_\text{m})$ denotes the phase noise at an offset frequency ω_{m}, P_{DC} is the power consumption, and ω_{0} is the oscillation frequency. By rearranging the expression, the figure of merit can also be written in terms of key oscillator design parameters, such as the tank quality factor Q, the excess noise factor F, and the efficiency η.

The overall efficiency η can be expressed as the product of current efficiency η_{I} and voltage efficiency η_{V}. The current efficiency η_{I} is defined as the ratio between the current injected into the tank at the oscillation frequency and the total current drawn from the supply. The voltage efficiency η_{V} is defined as the ratio between the single-ended oscillation amplitude (e.g., A_{0}/2) and the supply voltage. Both F and η depend on the technology and on the specific topology of the cross-coupled oscillator being used.

== CMOS cross-coupled oscillators ==
In CMOS technology, the most common cross-coupled LC oscillator topologies use either a single or a dual transconductor to provide the negative resistance required to sustain oscillation. In the single-transconductor configuration, one pair of MOSFETs injects current into the tank during only half of the oscillation cycle. This kind of operation is usually referred to as class B. In the dual-transconductor configuration—often referred to as complementary class B—nMOS and pMOS transistors are arranged symmetrically to alternately source and sink current, generating a differential square-wave current.

Single transconductor cross-coupled LC oscillator with nmos transistors (left) and complementary transconductor cross-coupled LC oscillator with nMOS and pMOS transistors (right). Both topologies have an nMOS current bias.

In the single-transconductor configuration, the current efficiency is η_{I} = 2/π ≈ 0.64. The current efficiency increases to η_{I} = 4/π ≈ 1.27 in the complementary configuration.

The voltage efficiency η_{V} is limited by the voltage headroom required by the bias transistor. In a single nMOS configuration, η_{V} typically reaches up to 0.66, while in the complementary case it is reduced to around 0.4 due to the voltage headroom required by the complementary structure. The overall efficiency η is approximately 0.5 in the complementary configuration, whereas it is slightly lower in the single-transconductor case, at about 0.42.

The excess noise factor of both single and complementary transconductors is equal to:

$$F_\text{nMOS} = 1 + \gamma + \frac{\gamma g_{m_\text{bias}} R_0}{4}$$
$$F_{\text{CMOS}} = 1 + \gamma + \gamma g_{m_\text{bias}} R_0 ,$$

in which $F_\text{nMOS}$ is the excess noise factor of the single transconductor topology, $F_\text{CMOS}$ is the excess noise factor of the complementary transconductor topology, $\gamma$ is a parameter dependent on the region of operation of the MOSFETs (typically below 2), while $g_{m_\text{bias}}$is the current generator transconductance.

=== Advanced topologies ===
Various techniques can be employed to reduce the excess noise factor and/or increase the oscillator's efficiency, thereby improving its phase noise performance and overall figure of merit.

==== LC tail filtering ====
Single (left) and complementary (right) transconductor cross-coupled LC oscillators with LC tail filtering and filter capacitance for bias transistor

LC tail filtering is a technique employed in both single- and complementary-transconductor oscillator topologies. It decouples the transistor's source voltage from the supply, improving voltage efficiency. Additionally, it enables the insertion of a capacitor to filter out noise injected by the current source, thereby reducing the excess noise factor.

In complementary topologies, this approach can increase the overall efficiency to approximately 0.8, compared to about 0.5 in configurations without tail filtering.

==== Class C CMOS oscillator ====
In a class C oscillator, the transistors operate in saturation (e.g., the drain-to-source voltage exceeds the gate-to-source voltage minus the threshold voltage for nMOS), and a capacitor is placed in parallel with the current source to enable more effective current injection into the tank. It allows the current efficiency η_{I} to approach 1 in a single-transconductor topology. However, operation in saturation limits the maximum achievable oscillation amplitude, i.e., the voltage efficiency. Despite this limitation, the overall efficiency can reach approximately 0.77.

==== Class D CMOS oscillator ====
In a class D oscillator, the transistors operate as switches, leveraging the advantages of CMOS technology scaling. This mode of operation enables a single-ended oscillation amplitude that can exceed the supply voltage by a factor of approximately three, resulting in a voltage efficiency η_{V} of about 3. Consequently, the overall efficiency can reach approximately 0.82.

==== Transformer-based CMOS oscillator ====
First introduced in the class C oscillator, the use of transformers in cross-coupled oscillators implemented in CMOS technology enables the introduction of gain between the drain and gate nodes of the transistors. A properly designed transformer can provide a voltage gain greater than one between its primary side (connected to the drains of the transistors) and its secondary side (connected to the gates). As a result, the gate waveforms are amplified, reducing noise injection from the transistors. This technique has been shown to reduce the excess noise factor due to the transconductor by a factor approximately equal to the gain introduced between these nodes.

== See also ==
- Clapp oscillator
- Colpitts oscillator
- Ring oscillator
- Voltage-controlled oscillator
- Phase-locked loop
- Frequency synthesizer

== Sources ==
- Nguyen, Cam (2015-03-04). Radio-Frequency Integrated-Circuit Engineering. John Wiley & Sons. ISBN 978-1-118-90047-5.
