= Burst mode clock and data recovery =

The passive optical network (PON) uses tree-like network topology. Due to the topology of PON, the transmission modes for downstream (that is, from optical line termination, (OLT) to optical network unit (ONU)) and upstream (that is, from ONU to OLT) are different. For the downstream transmission, the OLT broadcasts optical signal to all the ONUs in continuous mode (CM), that is, the downstream channel always has optical data signal. One given ONU can find which frame in the CM stream is for it by reading the header of the frame. However, in the upstream channel, ONUs can not transmit optical data signal in CM. It is because that all the signals transmitted from the ONUs converge (with attenuation) into one fiber by the power splitter (serving as power coupler), and overlap among themselves if CM is used. To solve this problem, burst mode (BM) transmission is adopted for upstream channel. The given ONU only transmits optical packet when it is allocated a time slot and it needs to transmit, and all the ONUs share the upstream channel in the time division multiple access (TDMA) mode. The phases of the BM optical packets received by the OLT are different from packet to packet, since the ONUs are not synchronized to transmit optical packet in the same phase, and the distance between OLT and given ONU are random. In order to compensate the phase variation from packet to packet, burst mode clock and data recovery (BM-CDR) is required. Such circuit can generate local clock with the frequency and phase same as the individual received optical packet in a short locking time, for example within 40 ns. Such generated local clock can in turn perform correct data decision. Above all, the clock and data recovery can be performed correctly after a short locking time.

The conventionally used PLL based clock recovery schemes can not meet such strict requirement on locking time. Various other schemes have been invented, including those employing gated oscillator or injection locked oscillator.
