= Andrew Viterbi =

Italian-American engineer and businessman

Andrew J. Viterbi
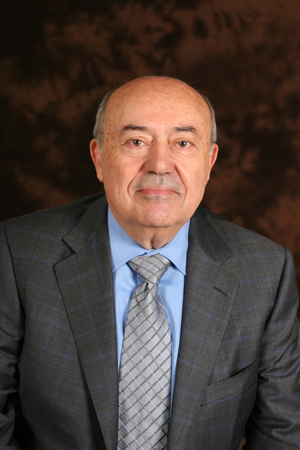
- Born: Andrea Giacomo Viterbi; March 9, 1935 (age 91); Bergamo, Italy
- Citizenship: American
- Education: Massachusetts Institute of Technology (BS, MS); University of Southern California (PhD)
- Spouse: Erna Finci (m. 1958; died 2015)
- Children: 3
- Engineering career
- Discipline: Electrical
- Institutions: University of Southern California Board of Trustees; The Scripps Research Institute Board of Trustees, Sanford Burnham Medical Research Institute
- Employers: Professor: UC Los Angeles; UC San Diego; Founder/Co-founder: Linkabit Corporation; Qualcomm Inc. The Viterbi Group
- Projects: Viterbi algorithm
- Significant advance: Code Division Multiple Access (CDMA) standard for cell phone networks
- Awards: IEEE Alexander Graham Bell Medal (1984); Marconi Prize (1990); Claude E. Shannon Award (1991); Wireless Hall of Fame (2000); National Medal of Science (2007); IEEE/RSE James Clerk Maxwell Medal (2007); Millennium Technology Prize (2008); IEEE Medal of Honor (2010); John Fritz Medal (2011)

Andrew James Viterbi (born Andrea Giacomo Viterbi, March 9, 1935) is an American electrical engineer and businessman who co-founded Qualcomm Inc. and invented the Viterbi algorithm. He is the Presidential Chair Professor of Electrical Engineering at the University of Southern California's Viterbi School of Engineering, which was named in his honor in 2004 in recognition of his $52 million gift.

== Early life ==
Viterbi was born to an Italian Jewish family in Bergamo, Italy, and emigrated with them to the United States two years before World War II. His original name was Andrea, but when he was naturalized in the US, his parents anglicized it to Andrew.

== Education ==
Viterbi attended the Boston Latin School, and then entered Massachusetts Institute of Technology (MIT) in 1952, studying electrical engineering. He received both BS and MS in electrical engineering in 1957 from MIT. He was elected to membership in the honor society Eta Kappa Nu in 1956 through the MIT chapter.

He worked at Raytheon and later at the Jet Propulsion Laboratory (JPL) in Pasadena, California, where he started working on telemetry for uncrewed space missions, also helping to develop the phase-locked loop. Simultaneously, he was carrying out PhD studies at the University of Southern California, where he graduated in 1963 in digital communications.

== Career ==
After receiving his PhD, he applied successfully for an academic position at University of California, Los Angeles (UCLA).

Viterbi was later a professor of electrical engineering at UCLA and University of California, San Diego (UCSD). In 1967 he proposed the Viterbi algorithm to decode convolutionally encoded data. It is still used widely in cellular phones for error correcting codes, as well as for speech recognition, DNA analysis, and many other applications of Hidden Markov models. On advice of a lawyer, Viterbi did not patent the algorithm. Viterbi also helped to develop the Code Division Multiple Access (CDMA) standard for cell phone networks.

Viterbi was the cofounder of Linkabit Corporation, with Irwin M. Jacobs in 1968, a small telecommunications contractor. He was also the co-founder of Qualcomm Inc. with Jacobs in 1985. As of 2003, he is the president of the venture capital company The Viterbi Group. He continues to be involved in wireless communications technology companies as a strategic advisor to Ingenu's board of directors.

Virterbi was elected a member of the National Academy of Engineering in 1978, and in 1996, he was elected a member of the National Academy of Sciences.

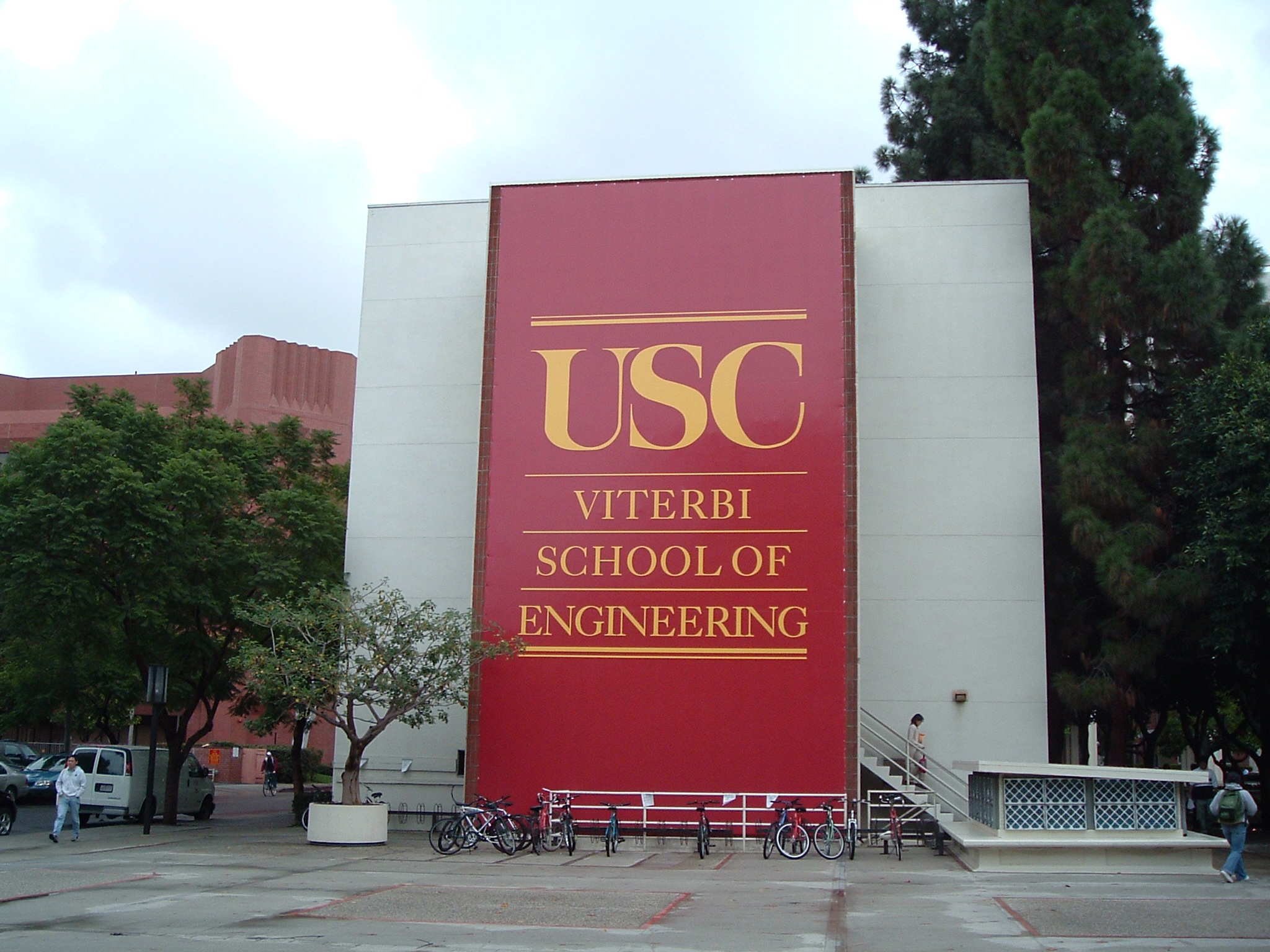
Viterbi School of Engineering, west wall

In 1998 he was one of the few receiving a Golden Jubilee Award for Technological Innovation from the IEEE Information Theory Society. Viterbi earned it for "the invention of the Viterbi algorithm". He was inducted into the Wireless Hall of Fame, in 2000, for his dedication to the cellular industry. In 2002, Viterbi dedicated the Andrew Viterbi '52 Computer Center at his alma mater, Boston Latin School. On March 2, 2004, the University of Southern California School of Engineering was renamed the Viterbi School of Engineering in his honor, following his $52 million donation to the school. He is a member of the USC board of trustees.

He is also on the Board of Trustees at The Scripps Research Institute.

He is also founding member of ISSNAF (The Italian Scientists and Scholars in North America Foundation).

In 2005, he was awarded the Benjamin Franklin Medal in Electrical Engineering.

In 2006, he was made an Eminent Member of Eta Kappa Nu.

Viterbi and Irwin M. Jacobs received the 2007 IEEE/RSE Wolfson James Clerk Maxwell Award, for "fundamental contributions, innovation, and leadership that enabled the growth of wireless telecommunications".

In 2008, he was named a Millennium Technology Prize finalist for the invention of the Viterbi algorithm. At the award ceremony in Finland on June 11, 2008, he was awarded a prize of EUR 115,000 and the prize trophy "Peak" as a 2008 Millennium Technology Laureate.

In September 2008, he was awarded the National Medal of Science for developing "the 'Viterbi algorithm', and for his contributions to Code Division Multiple Access (CDMA) wireless technology that transformed the theory and practice of digital communications".

In 2010, he received the IEEE Medal of Honor and in the same year he also received the IIC Lifetime Achievement Award by the Italian Cultural Institute of Los Angeles. In 2011, he received the John Fritz Medal from the American Association of Engineering Societies.

In 2013, Viterbi was inducted into the National Inventors Hall of Fame.

In 2017, Viterbi, along with Irwin Jacobs, received the IEEE Milestone Award for their CDMA and spread spectrum development that drives the mobile industry.

== Viterbi's problem on the coincidence of PLL ranges ==
A. Viterbi analytically showed that for the first-order PLL model (filterless model) the three main ranges (hold-in, pull-in, lock-in ranges) coincide. Various conjectures (e.g., Egan's conjecture on the pull-in range of type II APLL) and estimates of the ranges of higher-order PLL models appeared based on this result, which led to the problem of determining the regions of the physical parameters of the PLL (parameters of the phase detector, filter, and voltage-controlled oscillator) where the ranges coincide (Viterbi's problem on the coincidence of PLL ranges). In the framework of mathematical control theory, this result is a development of the ideas of the possibility of determining the global behavior of a nonlinear system via linear analysis and various well-known conjectures on global stability (Kalman's conjecture and others) for a cylindrical phase space.

== Personal life ==
Viterbi was married to Erna Finci (1934–2015), who was a Jewish refugee from Sarajevo in the former Yugoslavia. Erna was a Holocaust survivor. In 1941, during World War II, the Finci family fled German-occupied Yugoslavia for the Italian-occupied zone from which they were deported and interned in the Parma region of Italy. In 1943, when the Nazis occupied Italy, the family was saved from deportation to extermination camps by the people of Gramignazzo di Sissa, the village where they had been interned; they were cared for by the local Ponghellini family, who hid them in their vineyard when German forces advanced into Italy. Other Italians helped them escape to Switzerland, walking across the Alps, where they waited out the war.

They had three children, Alan Viterbi, Audrey Viterbi, and Alexander Viterbi (who died in 2011 at age 40). Alan served on the inaugural West Hollywood city council in 1984 when the city was incorporated, and served as the city's mayor in 1988. Audrey served as an assistant professor at UC Irvine.

== See also ==
- List of International Fellows of the Royal Academy of Engineering
- Viterbi Center for Public Opinion and Policy Research

Awards and achievements
Preceded by Gerald J. Posakony	John Fritz Medal; 2011	Succeeded by Leslie E. Robertson
Preceded by Robert H. Dennard	IEEE Medal of Honor; 2010	Succeeded by Morris Chang
Preceded by Hyman Bass	National Medal of Science; 2007	Succeeded by Leonard Kleinrock
Preceded by (First)	IEEE/RSE James Clerk Maxwell Medal; 2007	Succeeded by Tim Berners-Lee
Preceded by Thomas M. Cover	Claude E. Shannon Award; 1991	Succeeded by Elwyn Berlekamp
Preceded by Robert N. Hall	Marconi Prize; 1990	Succeeded by Paul Baran
Preceded by Stephen O. Rice	IEEE Alexander Graham Bell Medal; 1984	Succeeded by Charles K. Kao
