= Frequency-locked loop =

Electronic control system

A frequency-lock, or frequency-locked loop (FLL), is an electronic control system that generates a signal that is locked to the frequency of an input or "reference" signal. This circuit compares the frequency of a controlled oscillator to the reference, automatically raising or lowering the frequency of the oscillator until its frequency (but not necessarily its phase) is matched to that of the reference.

A frequency-locked loop is an example of a control system using negative feedback. Frequency-lock loops are used in radio, telecommunications, computers and other electronic applications to generate stable frequencies, or to recover a signal from a noisy communication channel.

A frequency-locked loop is similar to a phase-locked loop (PLL), but only attempts to control the derivative of phase, not the phase itself. Because it tries to do less, an FLL can acquire lock faster and over a wider range than a PLL. Sometimes the two are used in combination, with a frequency-locked loop used initially until the oscillator frequency is close enough to the reference that a PLL can take over.

Advanced applications can use both simultaneously, creating what is called an "FLL-assisted PLL" (FPLL).

== See also ==
- Phase-locked loop
