= Pulse-swallowing counter =

Component in all-digital feedback systems

A pulse-swallowing counter is a component in an all-digital feedback system. The divider produces one output pulse for every N counts (N is usually a power of 2) when not swallowing, and per N+1 pulses when the 'swallow' signal is active. The overall pulse-swallowing system is used as part of a fractional-N frequency divider. The overall pulse-swallowing system cancels beatnotes created when switching between N, N+1, or N−1 in a fractional-N synthesizer.
