= Phase detector characteristic =

A phase detector characteristic is a function of phase difference describing the output of the phase detector.

For the analysis of Phase detector it is usually considered the models of PD in signal (time) domain and phase-frequency domain. In this case for constructing of an adequate nonlinear mathematical model of PD in phase-frequency domain it is necessary to find the characteristic of phase detector. The inputs of PD are high-frequency signals and the output contains a low-frequency error correction signal, corresponding to a phase difference of input signals. For the suppression of high-frequency component of the output of PD (if such component exists) a low-pass filter is applied. The characteristic of PD is the dependence of the signal at the output of PD (in the phase-frequency domain) on the difference of phases at the input of PD.

This characteristic of PD depends on the realization of PD and the types of waveforms of signals. Consideration of PD characteristic allows to apply averaging methods for high frequency oscillations and to pass from analysis and simulation of non autonomous models of phase synchronization systems in time domain to analysis and simulation of autonomous dynamical models in phase-frequency domain .

== Analog multiplier phase detector characteristic ==
Consider a classical phase detector implemented with analog multiplier and low-pass filter.

Multiplier phase detector in time domain.

Here $f^1(\theta^1(t))$ and $f^2(\theta^2(t))$ denote high-frequency signals, piecewise differentiable functions $f^1(\theta)$, $f^2(\theta)$ represent waveforms of input signals, $\theta^{1,2}(t)$ denote phases, and $g(t)$ denotes the output of the filter. If $f^{1,2}(\theta)$ and $\theta^{1,2}(t)$ satisfy the high frequency conditions (see) then phase detector characteristic $\varphi(\theta)$ is calculated in such a way that time-domain model filter output

$$g(t) = \int\limits_0^t f^1(\theta^1(\tau))f^2(\theta^2(\tau))d \tau$$

and filter output for phase-frequency domain model

$$G(t) = \int\limits_0^t \varphi(\theta^1(\tau) - \theta^2(\tau))d \tau$$

are almost equal:

$$g(t) - G(t) \approx 0$$

Phase detector in phase-frequency domain.

=== Sine waveforms case ===
Consider a simple case of harmonic waveforms $f^1(\theta)=\sin(\theta),$ $f^2(\theta)=\cos(\theta)$ and integration filter.

$$\sin(\theta^1(t))\cos(\theta^2(t)) = \frac{1}{2}\sin(\theta^1(t) + \theta^2(t)) + \frac{1}{2}\sin(\theta^1(t) - \theta^2(t))$$

Standard engineering assumption is that the filter removes the upper sideband $\sin(\theta^1(t) + \theta^2(t))$ from the input but leaves the lower sideband $\sin(\theta^1(t) - \theta^2(t))$ without change.

Consequently, the PD characteristic in the case of sinusoidal waveforms is

$$\varphi(\theta) = \frac{1}{2}\sin(\theta).$$

=== Square waveforms case ===
Consider high-frequency square-wave signals $f^1(t) = \sgn(\sin(\theta^1(t)))$ and $f^2(t) = \sgn(\cos(\theta^2(t)))$. For this signals it was found that similar thing takes place. The characteristic for the case of square waveforms is

$$\varphi(\theta) = \begin{cases}
1+\frac{2\theta}{\pi}, & \text{if }\theta \in [-\pi,0],\\
1-\frac{2\theta}{\pi}, & \text{if }\theta \in [0,\pi].\\
\end{cases}$$

=== General waveforms case ===
Consider general case of piecewise-differentiable waveforms $f^{1}(\theta)$, $f^2(\theta)$.

This class of functions can be expanded in Fourier series. Denote by

$a^p_i=\frac{1}{\pi}\int\limits_{-\pi}^{\pi} f^p(x)\sin(ix)dx,$$b^p_i=\frac{1}{\pi}\int\limits_{-\pi}^{\pi} f^p(x)\cos(ix)dx,$$c^p_i=\frac{1}{\pi}\int\limits_{-\pi}^{\pi} f^p(x)dx, p = 1,2$

the Fourier coefficients of $f^1(\theta)$ and $f^2(\theta)$. Then the phase detector characteristic is

$$\varphi(\theta) = c^1c^2 + \frac{1}{2}\sum\limits_{l=1}^{\infty}\bigg((a^1_la^2_l + b^1_lb^2_l)\cos(l\theta) + (a^1_lb^2_l - b^1_la^2_l)\sin(l\theta)\bigg).$$

Obviously, the PD characteristic $\varphi(\theta)$ is periodic, continuous, and bounded on $\mathbb{R}$.

Modeling method based on this result is described in

=== Examples ===
Multiplier phase detector characteristics
Waveforms $f^{1,2}(\theta)$	PD characteristic $\varphi(\theta)$
