= PTTI =

PTTI may stand for:

- Postal, Telegraph and Telephone International, a former global union federation
- Precise Time and Time Interval, a standard for highly accurate timing
