= Gernot M. R. Winkler =

American physicist

Gernot Maria Rudolph Winkler (October 17, 1922 – April 30, 2016) was responsible for the Time Service Department of the United States Naval Observatory (USNO) from 1966 to 1996.

Winkler oversaw the introduction of caesium beam-based Coordinated Universal Time based on hyperfine transitions and an internationally transportable "flying clock".

This in turn led Winkler to promote precision global positioning techniques (initially by time-reliable surface broadcasts in the LORAN and Omega radio-beacon chains, later by two-way satellite time and frequency transfer (TWSTT).

== Early life ==
Gernot was born in the Austrian town of Frohnleiten, which is the home of a technology institute (Technisches Büro für Luftfahrt und Maschinenbau). He was the son of Gustav and Eleanor (Née Schneider) Winkler. His interest in astronomy was inspired by German spaceflight pioneer Hermann Oberth when he was about 12. The science fiction writer Jules Verne was also a favourite. During WWII he was drafted into the Wehrmacht; he was arrested by the US Army in Italy.

In 1947, Winkler resumed his studies at the University of Graz. In 1952 he obtained a PhD in theoretical physics and was an associate of the Kanzelhoehe Solar Observatory.

In 1956 he and fellow Austrian Fritz Reder arrived in the United States to work in the microwave resonance branch of the Signal Corps, joining the USNO that year.

== Recognition ==
- Winkler received several honours including:
  - the 1988 I. I. Rabi Award sponsored by the IEEE and
  - the Precise Time and Time Interval Distinguished Service Award of 1994 from the United States Department of Defense.
- A main-belt asteroid (6473 Winkler) was named in his honour. <-- NOTE: According to the IAU Minor Planet Center (minorplanetcenter.net/db_search/show_object?object_id=6473) this asteroid was: "Named in honor of Ron Winkler (b. 1954), digital engineer in the radio astronomy and radar group at NASA's Goldstone deep space communications complex."
- He is also remembered (in ESOC) for reputedly remarking that
  "Times can only improve if designers have their noses forced down on the grindstone of operations."
