= David W. Allan =

American physicist (born 1936)

David Wayne Allan
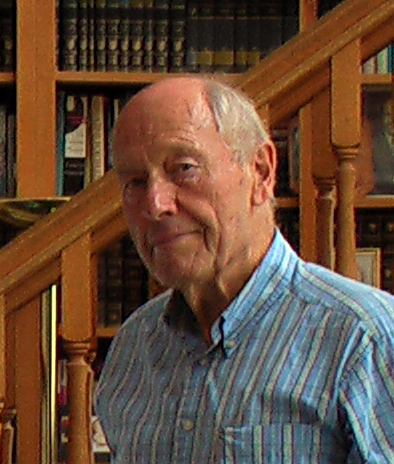
- Allan in August 2014
- Born: September 25, 1936 (age 90); Mapleton, Utah, United States
- Known for: Allan variance
- Awards: I. I. Rabi Award, 1984; Time Lord Award, 2011; IEEE Keithley Award, 2018
- Scientific career
- Fields: physics
- Workplaces: National Institute of Standards and Technology
- Website: allanstime.com, itsabouttimebook.com

David Wayne Allan (born September 25, 1936) is an American atomic clock physicist and author of the Allan variance (AVAR), also known as the two-sample variance, a measure of frequency stability in clocks, oscillators and other applications. He worked for the National Bureau of Standards in Colorado.

In 1981 Allan developed the Modified Allan variance (MVAR) and then developed the Time variance (TVAR) in the late 1980s. AVAR, MVAR, and TVAR were made IEEE standards in 1988, and are used widely in the time and frequency, navigation, and telecom communities, respectively.

Allan was born in Mapleton, Utah, on September 25, 1936 and attended Springville High School. He studied physics at Brigham Young University (B.S. 1960) and the University of Colorado Boulder (M.S. 1965). From 1960 to 1992, he was a physicist in the Time and Frequency Division of the National Institute of Standards and Technology (then the National Bureau of Standards) in Boulder, and from 1979-1992 served as chief of the Time and Frequency Coordination Group. In 1981, he was a consultant for the United Nations Development Programme in New Delhi, and a guest scientist in the People's Republic of China in 1982.

He retired from government work in 1992 and resides in Fountain Green, Utah, where he and his wife live in a self-designed, furnace-less solar home. He consulted for Hewlett Packard from 1993 to 1997. While there, he contributed to "The Science of Timekeeping, which documents his contributions to the nation as a timekeeper- generating time from an ensemble of atomic clocks and from the nation's primary frequency standard at NIST/NBS.

Allan is a member of the Church of Jesus Christ of Latter-day Saints. He has been married since 1959.

== Awards ==
Allan received the Silver Medal of the Department of Commerce in 1968 and an IR-100 award of the Industrial Research magazine in 1976. He received the Rabi Award of the IEEE Ultrasonics, Ferroelectrics, and Frequency Control Society in 1984. In 1999 he was named an honorary fellow of the Institute of Navigation.

The IEEE has published over a hundred peer-reviewed papers of Allan's, and in 2016, the IEEE celebrated the 50th anniversary of the publication of Allan’s master’s thesis that gave birth to the Allan variance. He was given an achievement award with the citation: “For seminal work… time determination, time prediction, time dissemination, and timekeeping through contributions to atomic frequency standards, space-based navigation, time and frequency stability analysis, time-scale algorithms, and timekeeping devices.”

In 2018 he received the Joseph F. Keithley Award in Instrumentation and Measurement of the Institute of Electrical and Electronics Engineers, and in the citation it reads "Leadership in time determination and precise timing instruments."

Due to his long career the IEEE completed an oral history and interview, and in 2021, the IEEE made him an IEEE fellow.
