= United States Naval Observatory =

Scientific agency in the United States

Naval Support Facility US Naval Observatory
- Part of Naval Support Activity Washington
- Northwest Washington, D.C. in the United States
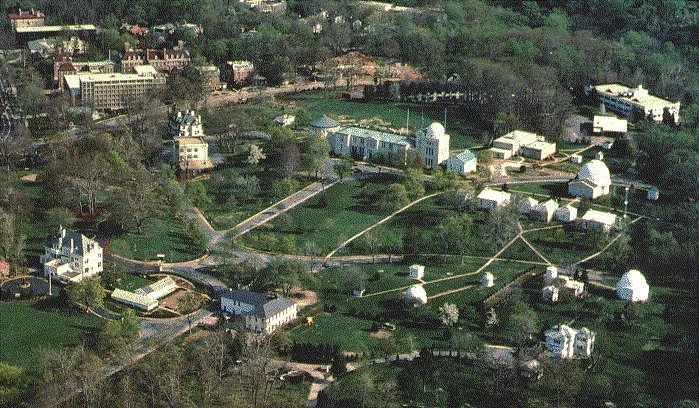
- An aerial view of the United States Naval Observatory in 2004

Site information
- Type: Military observatory and official residence of the US vice president
- Owner: Department of Defense
- Operator: US Navy
- Controlled by: Naval District Washington
- Condition: Operational
- Website: www.cnmoc.usff.navy.mil/usno/

D.C. Inventory of Historic Sites
- Official name: Naval Observatory Historic District (New Naval Observatory)

U.S. National Register of Historic Places
- Designated: 2025-08-04
- Reference no.: 100010550

Location
- Location within Washington, D.C. Location within the United States
- Coordinates: 38°55′17″N 77°04′01″W

Site history
- Built: 1830 (as Depot of Charts and Instruments)
- In use: 1830–present

Garrison information
- Current commander: Captain Mark Burns
- Garrison: United States Naval Observatory

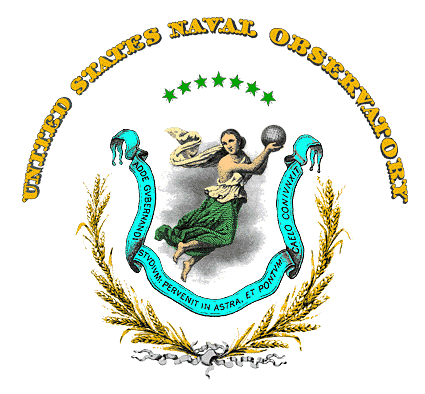
The Seal of the USNO with a quote from the Astronomica by Marcus Manilius, Adde gubernandi studium: Pervenit in astra, et pontum caelo conjunxit [Increase the study of navigation: It arrives in the stars, and marries the sea with heaven].

The United States Naval Observatory (USNO) is a scientific and military facility that produces geopositioning, navigation and timekeeping data for the United States Navy and the United States Department of Defense. Established in 1830 as the Depot of Charts and Instruments, it is one of the oldest scientific agencies in the United States, and remains a leading facility for astronomical and timing data.

The observatory is located in Northwest Washington, D.C. at the northwestern end of Embassy Row. It is among the few pre-20th century astronomical observatories located in an urban area. In 1893, in an effort to escape light pollution, it was relocated from Foggy Bottom near the city's center, to its Northwest Washington, D.C. location.

The USNO has conducted significant scientific studies throughout its history, including measuring the speed of light, observing solar eclipses, and discovering the moons of Mars. Its achievements include providing data for the first radio time signals, constructing some of the earliest and most accurate telescopes of their kind, and helping develop universal time. The Naval Observatory performs radio VLBI-based positions of quasars for astrometry and geodesy with numerous global collaborators (IERS), in order to produce Earth orientation parameters and to realize the celestial reference system (ICRF).

Aside from its scientific mission, since the 1970s the Naval Observatory campus hosts the official residence of the vice president of the United States.

== History ==
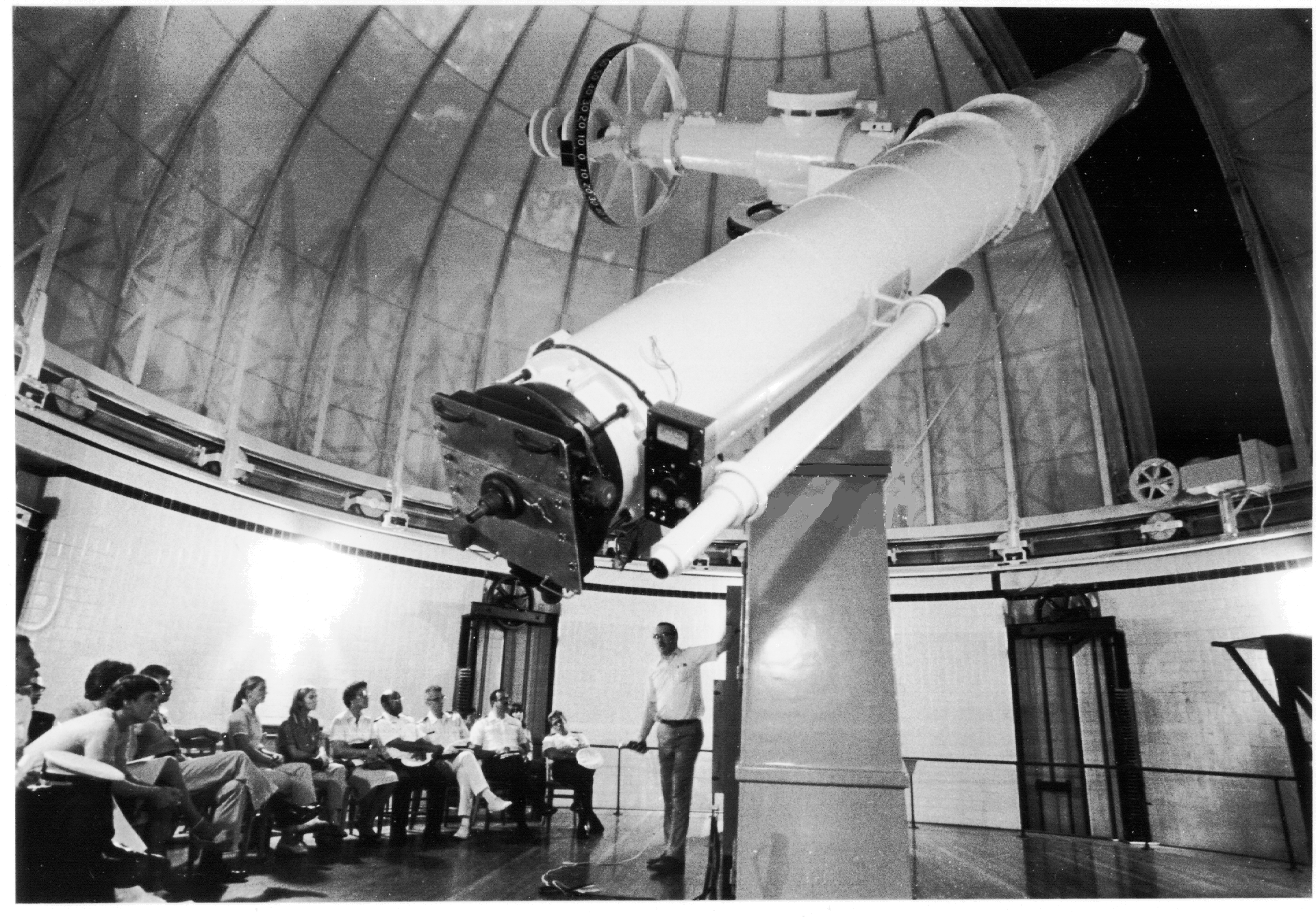
The 26 inch (66 cm) aperture telescope, with which Asaph Hall discovered the moons of Mars in 1877; the telescope is shown at its modern Northwest DC location.

President John Quincy Adams, who in 1825 signed the bill for the creation of a national observatory just before leaving presidential office, had intended for it to be called the National Observatory.

The names "National Observatory" and "Naval Observatory" were both used for 10 years, until the Secretary of the Navy officially adopted the latter.

Adams had made protracted efforts to bring astronomy to a national level. He spent many nights at the observatory, watching and charting the stars, which had always been one of his interests.

Established by order of the United States Secretary of the Navy John Branch on 6 December 1830 as the Depot of Charts and Instruments, the Observatory rose from humble beginnings: Placed under the command of Lieutenant Louis M. Goldsborough, with an annual budget of $330; its primary function was the restoration, repair, and rating of navigational instruments.

=== Old Naval Observatory ===
It was established as a national observatory in 1842 by federal law and a Congressional appropriation of $25,000. Lt. J.M. Gilliss was put in charge of "obtaining the instruments needed and books." Lt. Gilliss visited the principal observatories of Europe with the mission to purchase telescopes and other scientific devices, and books.

The observatory's primary mission was to care for the United States Navy's marine chronometers, charts, and other navigational equipment. It calibrated ships' chronometers by timing the transit of stars across the meridian. It opened in 1844 in Foggy Bottom, north of the site of the Lincoln Memorial and west of the White House.

In 1893, the observatory moved to its current location in Northwest Washington, D.C. located on a 2000 foot circle of land atop "Observatory Hill", overlooking Massachusetts Avenue.

In 2017, the facilities were listed on the National Register of Historic Places.

=== The time ball ===
The first superintendent was Navy Commander M.F. Maury. Maury had the world's first vulcanized time ball, created to his specifications by Charles Goodyear for the U.S. Observatory. Placed into service in 1845, it was the first time ball in the United States and the 12th in the world. Maury kept accurate time by the stars and planets.

The time ball was dropped every day except Sunday, precisely at the astronomically defined moment of mean solar noon; this enabled all ships and civilians within sight to know the exact time. By the end of the American Civil War, the Observatory's clocks were linked via telegraph to ring the alarm bells in all of the Washington, D.C. firehouses three times a day.

The USNO held a one-off time-ball re-enactment for the year-2000 celebration.

=== Nautical Almanac Office ===
In 1849, the Nautical Almanac Office (NAO) was established in Cambridge, Massachusetts as a separate organization. In 1866, it was moved to Washington, D.C., operating near Fort Myer. It relocated to the U.S. Naval Observatory grounds in 1893.

On 20 September 1894, the NAO became a "branch" of USNO; however, it remained autonomous for several years.

The site houses the largest astronomy library in the United States (and the largest astrophysical periodicals collection in the world). The library includes a large collection of rare physics and astronomy books from the past millennium.

=== Measuring the astronomical unit ===
An early scientific duty assigned to the Observatory was the U.S. contribution to the definition of the Astronomical Unit, or the AU, which defines a standard mean distance between the Sun and the Earth. This was conducted under the auspices of the congressionally-funded U.S. Transit of Venus Commission. The astronomical measurements taken of the transit of Venus by a number of countries since 1639 resulted in a progressively more accurate definition of the AU.

Relying strongly on photographic methods, the naval observers returned 350 photographic plates in 1874, and 1,380 measurable plates in 1882. The results of the surveys conducted simultaneously from several locations around the world (for each of the two transits) produced a final value of the solar parallax, after adjustments, of 8.809″, with a probable error of 0.0059″, yielding a U.S.-determined Earth-Sun distance of 92,797,000 mi (149,342,000 km), with a probable error of 59,700 mi (96,100 km). The calculated distance was a significant improvement over several previous estimates.

=== The 26 inch refractor and 40 inch reflector ===
The telescope used for the discovery of the Moons of Mars was the 26 inch (66 cm) refractor telescope, then located at Foggy Bottom, Washington, DC. In 1893 it was moved to its Northwest DC location.

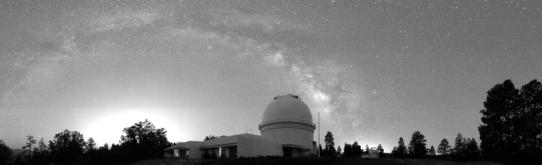
Naval Observatory Flagstaff Station

In 1934, the largest optical telescope installed at USNO saw "first light". This 40 inch aperture instrument was also the second (and final) telescope made by famed optician, George Willis Ritchey. The Ritchey–Chrétien telescope design has since become the de facto optical design for nearly all major telescopes, including the famed Keck telescopes and the space-borne Hubble Space Telescope.

Because of light pollution in the Washington metropolitan area, USNO relocated the 40 inch telescope to Flagstaff, Arizona. A new Navy command, now called the USNO Flagstaff Station (NOFS), was established there. Those operations began in 1955. Within a decade, the Navy's largest telescope, the 61 inch "Kaj Strand Astrometric Reflector" was built; it saw light at Flagstaff in 1964.

USNO continues to maintain its dark-sky observatory, NOFS, near Flagstaff. This facility now oversees the Navy Precision Optical Interferometer.

=== History of the time service ===
By the early 1870s the USNO daily noon-time signal was distributed electrically, nationwide, via the Western Union Telegraph Company. Time was also "sold" to the railroads and was used in conjunction with railroad chronometers to schedule American rail transport. Early in the 20th century, the service was broadcast by radio, with Arlington time signal available to those with Wireless receivers.

In November 1913 the Paris Observatory, using the Eiffel Tower as an antenna, exchanged sustained wireless (radio) signals with the U.S. Naval Observatory to determine the exact difference of longitude between the two institutions, via an antenna in Arlington, Virginia.

The U.S. Naval Observatory in Washington continues to be a major authority in the areas of Precise Time and Time Interval, Earth orientation, astrometry, and celestial observation. In collaboration with many national and international scientific establishments, it determines the timing and astronomical data required for accurate navigation, astrometry, and fundamental astronomy, and calculation methods — and distributes this information (such as star catalogs) on-line and in the annual publications The Astronomical Almanac and The Nautical Almanac.

Former USNO director Gernot M. R. Winkler initiated the "Master clock" service that the USNO still operates, and which provides precise time to the GPS satellite constellation run by the United States Space Force. The alternate Master Clock time service continues to operate at Schriever Space Force Base in Colorado.

== Departments ==
In 1990 two departments were established: Orbital Mechanics and Astronomical Applications, with the Nautical Almanac Office a division in Astronomical Applications. The Orbital Mechanics Department operated under P. Kenneth Seidelmann until 1994, when the department was abolished and its functions transferred to a group within the Astronomical Applications Department.

In 2010, USNO's astronomical 'department' known as the Naval Observatory Flagstaff Station (NOFS) was officially made autonomous as an Echelon 5 command, separate from, but still reporting to the USNO in Washington. In the alpine woodlands above 7,000 feet altitude outside Flagstaff, Arizona, NOFS performs its national, Celestial Reference Frame (CRF) mission under dark skies in that region.

=== Official residence of the vice president of the United States ===
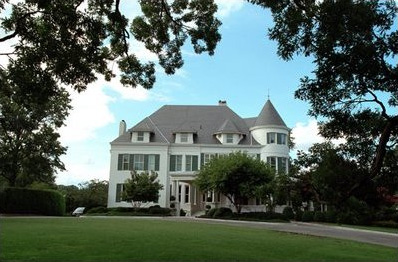
Number One Observatory Circle, official home of the U.S. vice president.

A house situated on the grounds of the observatory, at Number One Observatory Circle, has been the official residence of the vice president of the United States since 1974. It is protected by tight security control enforced by the Secret Service. The house is separated from the Naval Observatory.

Before serving as the vice president's residence, it was that of the observatory's superintendent, and later the chief of naval operations.

== Time service ==
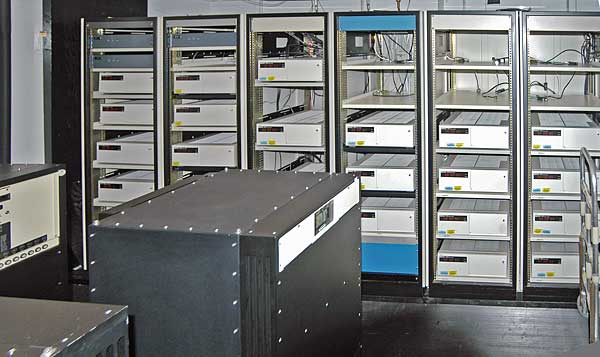
Atomic clock ensemble at the U.S. Naval Observatory

The U.S. Naval Observatory operates two "Master Clock" facilities, one in Washington, DC, and the other at Schriever SFB near Colorado Springs, CO.

- The primary facility, in Washington, D.C. maintains 57 HP/Agilent/Symmetricom 5071A-001 high performance cesium atomic clocks and 24 hydrogen masers.
- The alternate facility, at Schriever Space Force Base, maintains 12 cesium clocks and 3 masers.

The observatory also operates four rubidium atomic fountain clocks, which have a stability reaching 7×10^{−16}. The observatory plans to build several more of this type for use at its two facilities.

The clocks used for the USNO timescale are kept in 19 environmental chambers, whose temperatures are kept constant to within 0.1°C. The relative humidities are kept constant in all maser, and most cesiums enclosures, to within 1%. Time-scale management only uses the clocks in Washington, DC, and of those, preferentially uses the clocks that currently conform reliably to the time reports of the majority. It is the combined 'vote' of the ensemble that constitutes the otherwise-fictitious "Master Clock". The time-scale computations on 7 June 2007 weighted 70 of the clocks into the standard.

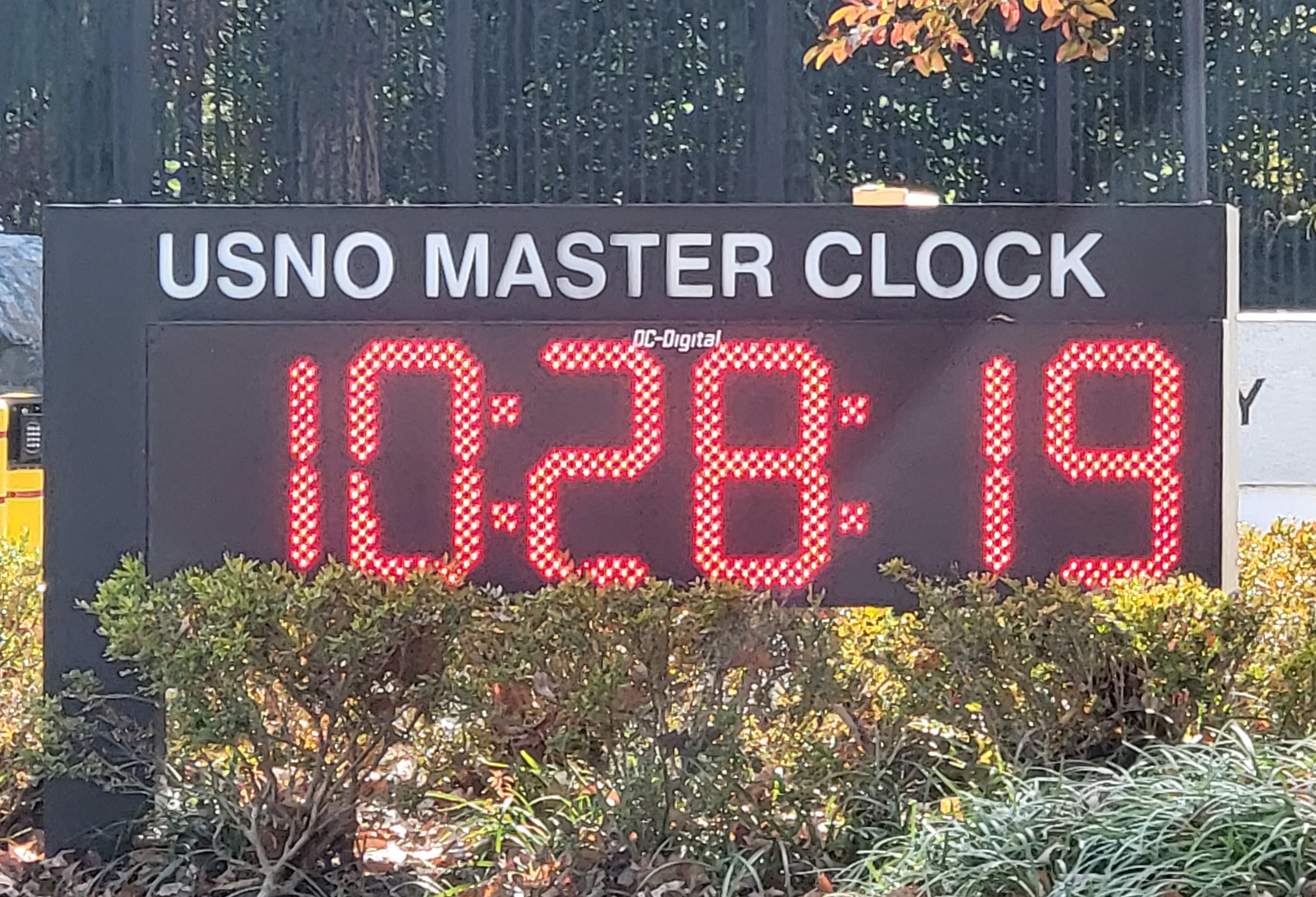
US Naval Observatory outside display of the master clock time

The U.S. Naval Observatory provides public time service via 26 NTP servers on the public Internet, and via telephone voice announcements:

- +1 202 762-1401 (Washington, DC)
- +1 202 762-1069 (Washington, DC)
- +1 719 567-6742 (Colorado Springs, CO)

The voice of actor Fred Covington (1928–1993) has been announcing the USNO time since 1978.

The voice announcements always begin with the local time (daylight or standard), and include a background of 1 second ticks. Local time announcements are made on the minute, and 15, 30, and 45 seconds after the minute. Coordinated Universal Time (UTC) is announced 5 seconds after the local time. Upon connecting, only the second-marking ticks are heard for the few seconds before the next scheduled local time announcement.

The USNO also operates a modem time service, and provides time to the Global Positioning System.

== Instrument shop ==
The United States Naval Observatory Instrument shop has been designing and manufacturing precise instrumentation since the early 1900s.

== Publications ==
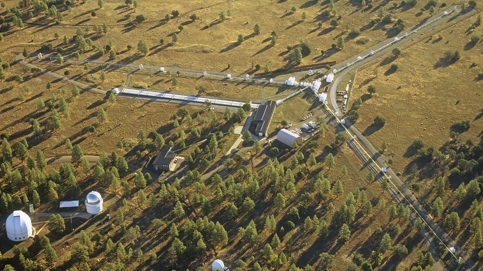
Navy Precision Optical Interferometer, Flagstaff, Arizona

- Astronomical Observations made at the U.S. Naval Observatory (USNOA) (v. 1–6: 1846–1867)
- Astronomical and Meteorological Observations made at the U.S. Naval Observatory (USNOM) (v. 1–22: 1862–1880)
- Observations made at the U.S. Naval Observatory (USNOO) (v. 1–7: 1887–1893)
- Publications of the U.S. Naval Observatory, Second Series (PUSNO) (v. 1–16: 1900–1949)
- U.S. Naval Observatory Circulars
- The Astronomical Almanac
- The Nautical Almanac
- The Air Almanac
- Astronomical Phenomena

== See also ==
Astronomy and observatories

- dark-sky movement
- List of astronomical observatories
- The Old Naval Observatory
- USNO Flagstaff Station

Technology and technical resources

- Coordinated Universal Time (UTC)
- Naval Observatory Vector Astrometry Subroutines
- railroad chronometer
- time ball
- Time signal
- time service radio stations WWV, WWVH, & WWVB

USNO personnel

- Rear Admiral Samuel P. Carter
- Lieutenant James Melville Gilliss
- Lieutenant Louis M. Goldsborough
- Commander Matthew Fontaine Maury
- astronomer P. Kenneth Seidelmann
- director Gernot M. R. Winkler
