= Time deviation =

Deviation of time source

Time deviation (TDEV), also known as $\sigma_x(\tau)$, measures the time stability of a clock source's phase over an observation interval, expressed as a standard deviation of the time variations. This indicates the time instability of the signal source. This is a scaled variant of frequency stability of Allan deviation. It is commonly defined from the modified Allan deviation, but other estimators may be used.

Time variance (TVAR), symbolised as $\sigma_x^2(\tau)$, is the time stability of phase versus observation interval tau. It is a scaled variant of modified Allan variance.

TDEV is a metric often used to determine an aspect of the quality of timing signals in telecommunication applications and is a statistical analysis of the phase stability of a signal over a given period. Measurements of a reference timing signal will refer to its TDEV and maximum time interval error (MTIE) values, comparing them to specified masks or goals.

== Definition ==
The most common estimator uses the modified Allan variance

$$\sigma_x^2(\tau) = \frac{\tau^2}{3}\operatorname{mod}\sigma_y^2(n\tau_0)$$

where $\tau = n\tau_o$. The 3 in the denominator normalizes TVAR to be equal to the classical variance if the deviations in x are random and uncorrelated (white noise).

Alternatively, TDEV, which is the square-root of TVAR, may be derived from MDEV modified Allan deviation

$$\sigma_x(\tau) = \frac{\tau}{\sqrt{3}}\operatorname{mod}\sigma_y(n\tau_0)$$
