= Maximum time interval error =

Clock error measurement

Maximum time interval error (MTIE) is the maximum error committed by a clock under test in measuring a time interval for a given period of time. It is used to specify clock stability requirements in telecommunications standards. MTIE measurements can be used to detect clock instability that can cause data loss on a communications channel.

== Measurement ==
A given dataset (clock waveform) is first compared to some reference. Phase error (usually measured in nanoseconds) is calculated for an observation interval. This phase shift is known as time interval error (TIE). MTIE is a function of the observation interval. An observation interval window moved across the dataset. Each time the peak-to-peak distance between the largest and smallest TIE in that window is noted. This distance varies as the window moves, being maximal for some window position. This maximal distance is known as MTIE for the given observation interval.

Plotting MTIE vs. different observation interval duration gives a chart useful for characterizing the stability of the clock.

== See also ==
- Allan variance
- Clock drift
- Instantaneous phase
- Jitter
- Phase noise
- Plesiochronous digital hierarchy
- Time deviation
