= Dead time =

Time after an event when a detector can't record another event

For detection systems that record discrete events, such as particle and nuclear detectors, the dead time is the time after each event during which the system is not able to record another event. An everyday life example of this is what happens when someone takes a photo using a flash – another picture cannot be taken immediately afterward because the flash needs a few seconds to recharge. In addition to lowering the detection efficiency, dead times can have other effects, such as creating possible exploits in quantum cryptography.

== Overview ==
The total dead time of a detection system is usually due to the contributions of the intrinsic dead time of the detector (for example the ion drift time in a gaseous ionization detector), of the analog front end (for example the shaping time of a spectroscopy amplifier) and of the data acquisition (the conversion time of the analog-to-digital converters and the readout and storage times).

The intrinsic dead time of a detector is often due to its physical characteristics; for example a spark chamber is "dead" until the potential between the plates recovers above a high enough value. In other cases the detector, after a first event, is still "live" and does produce a signal for the successive event, but the signal is such that the detector readout is unable to discriminate and separate them, resulting in an event loss or in a so-called "pile-up" event where, for example, a (possibly partial) sum of the deposited energies from the two events is recorded instead. In some cases this can be minimised by an appropriate design, but often only at the expense of other properties like energy resolution.

The analog electronics can also introduce dead time; in particular a shaping spectroscopy amplifier needs to integrate a fast rise, slow fall signal over the longest possible time (usually 0.5–10 microseconds) to attain the best possible resolution, such that the user needs to choose a compromise between event rate and resolution.

Trigger logic is another possible source of dead time; beyond the proper time of the signal processing, spurious triggers caused by noise need to be taken into account.

Finally, digitisation, readout and storage of the event, especially in detection systems with large number of channels like those used in modern High Energy Physics experiments, also contribute to the total dead time. To alleviate the issue, medium and large experiments use sophisticated pipelining and multi-level trigger logic to reduce the readout rates.

From the total time a detection system is running, the dead time must be subtracted to obtain the live time.

== Paralyzable and non-paralyzable behaviour ==
A detector, or detection system, can be characterized by a paralyzable or non-paralyzable behaviour. In a non-paralyzable detector, an event happening during the dead time is simply lost, so that with an increasing event rate the detector will reach a saturation rate equal to the inverse of the dead time. In a paralyzable detector, an event happening during the dead time will not just be missed, but will restart the dead time, so that with increasing rate the detector will reach a saturation point where it will be incapable of recording any event at all. A semi-paralyzable detector exhibits an intermediate behaviour, in which the event arriving during dead time does extend it, but not by the full amount, resulting in a detection rate that decreases when the event rate approaches saturation.

== Analysis ==
It will be assumed that the events are occurring randomly with an average frequency of f. That is, they constitute a Poisson process. The probability that an event will occur in an infinitesimal time interval dt is then f dt. It follows that the probability P(t) that an event will occur at time t to t+dt with no events occurring between t=0 and time t is given by the exponential distribution (Lucke 1974, Meeks 2008):

$$P(t)dt=fe^{-ft}dt\,$$

The expected time between events is then

$$\langle t \rangle = \int_0^\infty tP(t)dt = 1/f$$

=== Non-paralyzable analysis ===
For the non-paralyzable case, with a dead time of $\tau$, the probability of measuring an event between $t=0$ and $t=\tau$ is zero. Otherwise the probabilities of measurement are the same as the event probabilities. The probability of measuring an event at time t with no intervening measurements is then given by an exponential distribution shifted by $\tau$:

$P_m(t)dt=0\,$ for $t\le\tau\,$

$P_m(t)dt=\frac{fe^{-ft}dt}{\int_\tau^\infty fe^{-ft}dt} = fe^{-f(t-\tau)}dt$ for $t>\tau\,$

The expected time between measurements is then

$$\langle t_m \rangle = \int_\tau^\infty tP_m(t)dt = \langle t \rangle+\tau$$

In other words, if $N_m$ counts are recorded during a particular time interval $T$ and the dead time is known, the actual number of events (N) may be estimated by

$$N \approx \frac{N_m}{1 - N_m \frac{\tau}{T}}$$

If the dead time is not known, a statistical analysis can yield the correct count. For example, (Meeks 2008), if $t_i$ are a set of intervals between measurements, then the $t_i$ will have a shifted exponential distribution, but if a fixed value D is subtracted from each interval, with negative values discarded, the distribution will be exponential as long as D is greater than the dead time $\tau$. For an exponential distribution, the following relationship holds:

$$\frac{\langle t^n \rangle}{\langle t \rangle^n} = n!$$

where n is any integer. If the above function is estimated for many measured intervals with various values of D subtracted (and for various values of n) it should be found that for values of D above a certain threshold, the above equation will be nearly true, and the count rate derived from these modified intervals will be equal to the true count rate.

== Time-To-Count ==
With a modern microprocessor based ratemeter one technique for measuring field strength with detectors (e.g., Geiger–Müller tubes) with a recovery time is Time-To-Count. In this technique, the detector is armed at the same time a counter is started. When a strike occurs, the counter is stopped. If this happens many times in a certain time period (e.g., two seconds), then the mean time between strikes can be determined, and thus the count rate. Live time, dead time, and total time are thus measured, not estimated. This technique is used quite widely in radiation monitoring systems used in nuclear power generating stations.

== See also ==
- Data acquisition (DAQ)
- Allan variance
- Photomultiplier
- Positron emission tomography
- Class-D amplifier
