= Patrick Gill (physicist) =

British physicist

Patrick Gill MBE FRS
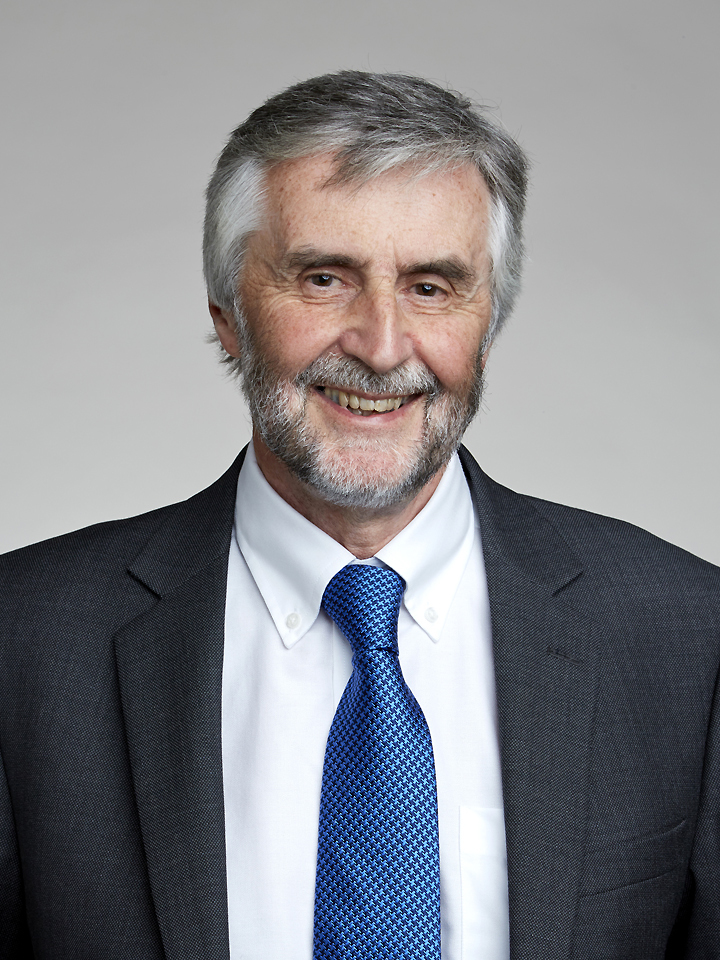
- Gill in 2016
- Alma mater: University of Oxford; University of Sussex
- Employer: Imperial College London; National Physical Laboratory; University of Oxford
- Awards: Young Medal and Prize; I. I. Rabi Award
- Website: www.npl.co.uk/people/patrick-gill
- Scientific career
- Thesis: Charge Transfer as a Laser Excitation Mechanism (1975)
- Doctoral advisor: Colin Webb

Patrick Gill is a British physicist who is a Senior NPL Fellow in Time & Frequency at the National Physical Laboratory (NPL) in the UK.

== Education ==
Gill was educated at the University of Sussex and the University of Oxford where he was awarded a Doctor of Philosophy degree in 1975 for research on Charge Transfer as a Laser Excitation Mechanism.

== Research ==
Gill's research is concerned with laser frequency stabilisation techniques for very high resolution spectroscopy, and the development of leading-edge optical atomic clocks that look to form the basis of a future redefinition of the SI base unit second. These include optical clocks based on laser-cooled single ions confined in radiofrequency traps and neutral atoms held in optical lattices, and which now reach uncertainties below that of the caesium fountain primary frequency standard.

Additionally, he has developed a range of stable lasers and optical metrology instrumentation with application to high technology sectors such as precision engineering and manufacture, space science, satellite navigation, Earth observation, defence and security and optical telecommunications.

== Awards and honours ==
Gill is a Fellow of the Institute of Physics (FInstP) and was awarded their Young Medal and Prize in 2008 for world-leading contributions to optical frequency metrology. He also received the I. I. Rabi Award in 2007 from the IEEE International Frequency Control Symposium for contributions to time and frequency metrology and the realisation of single ion optical frequency standards. More recently, his group received the Royal Institute of Navigation's Duke of Edinburgh Award in 2014 for long term atomic clock development. Patrick is a visiting professor at Imperial College London and the University of Oxford. He was awarded an MBE for services to Science in The Queen's 2015 New Year Honours. Gill was elected a Fellow of the Royal Society (FRS) in 2016.
