= John Prestage =

American physicist

John D. Prestage is an American physicist currently at NASA and an Elected Fellow of the American Physical Society. He pioneered and designed several ion-trap atomic clocks including the physics package for the NASA Deep Space Atomic Clock (DSAC) Technology Demonstration Mission.

== Career ==
Prestage is currently the Science and Technology lead for the NASA/JPL DSAC (Deep Space Atomic Clock) mission, where an ion-atomic clock has been developed for deep space and Earth orbit operation and is the prototype for the next generation GPS space atomic clock. Prior to DSAC, he led the SCaN Space Ion Clock Technology Development Team where a prototype ion-clock led to the DSAC flight clock.

He developed the first linear rf ion trap, the first multi-pole linear ion trap together with ion transfer methodology to enable ultra-stable atomic ion clock operation. Ion-clocks based on this architecture were the first to exceed the stability of H-maser clocks. Linear ion traps are now used worldwide for ion clocks, quantum computing, and quadrupole mass analyzers.

He designed and delivered small ion trap physics packages for DARPA small atomic clock competitions, both the IMPACT and ACES programs. He created and carried out new tests of Local Lorentz Invariance and Local Position Invariance – both cornerstones of Einstein's General Relativity. Two NASA mission proposals (SMEX and MIDEX mission Space-Time) were based on this work. This work started the modern day clock comparison searches for time variation of the fundamental constants.

Prestage is also an active IEEE member in the International Frequency Control Symposium where he served as Technical Program Chair for 2000 and 2001. He also spent several years as Tutorials Chair.

== Selected awards ==
He has been awarded over 20 NASA New Technology Awards, 3 patents, a NASA Exceptional Technology Achievement Medal (2004 Citation: "Linear Ion Trap Frequency Standards with Ultra-high Stability Suitable for Space and Ground Applications") and the NASA Space Technology Mission Directorate Ground Breaker Award (2015), all in the field of ion-trap atomic clocks.

In 2009, he was awarded the highest IEEE prize in clock science and technology, the I. I. Rabi Award for 'Seminal work on the time variation of the fundamental constants and outstanding contributions to trapped ion clocks'.

He was elected Fellow of the American Physical Society for 'developing fundamental physics tests of local Lorentz invariance and local position invariance, and for pioneering ion clock technology that has enabled stabilities exceeding those of the hydrogen maser'.
