= Data-dependent jitter =

Data-dependent jitter (DDJ) is a specific class of timing jitter. In particular, it is a form of deterministic jitter which is correlated with the sequence of bits in the data stream. It is also a form of ISI.

== Properties ==
Depending on characteristics of the signal and transmission topology, previously transmitted symbols can affect the edge cross over time. This creates a probability distribution for the timing of the signal edge, which is usually recorded in a PDF.

DDJ's PDF is always a series of pulses at the locations where a specific bit pattern experiences a cross over. Therefore, in order to get an accurate measure of the DDJ in a particular system, a large number of bit patterns must be analyzed (often just a PRBS) unless an analytical solution can be found.
