= Mapleton, Utah =

City in Utah, United States

- City
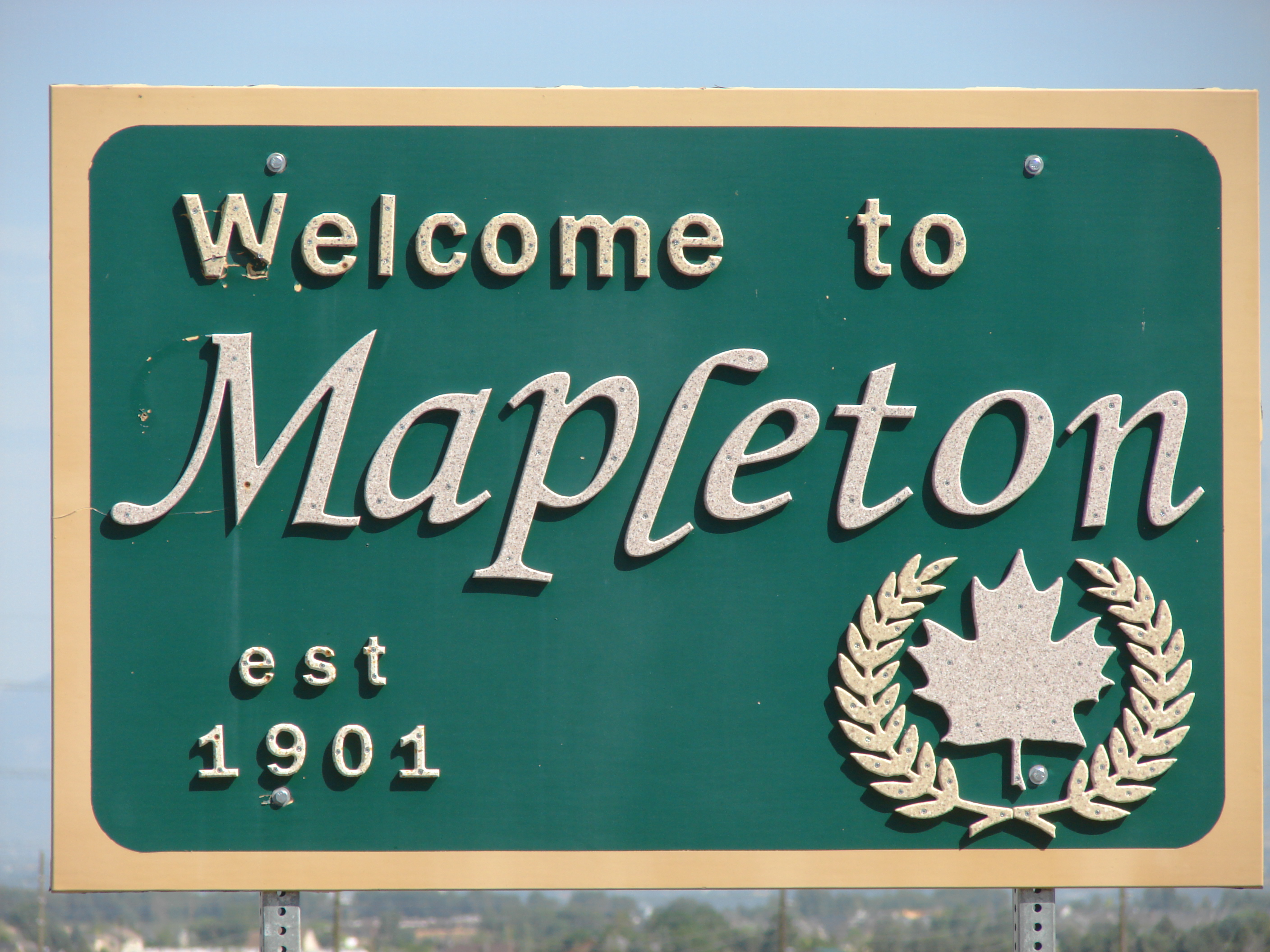

- Location in Utah County and the state of Utah
- Coordinates: 40°08′02″N 111°34′28″W
- Country: United States
- State: Utah
- County: Utah
- Settled: 1856
- Incorporated: September 3, 1901 (town) April 1, 1948 (city)
- Named for: Maple trees

Area
  - Total: 13.34 sq mi (34.56 km^{2})
  - Land: 13.34 sq mi (34.56 km^{2})
  - Water: 0 sq mi (0.00 km^{2})
- Elevation: 4,748 ft (1,447 m)

Population (2020)
  - Total: 11,365
  - Density: 851.7/sq mi (328.85/km^{2})
- Time zone: UTC-7 (Mountain (MST))
  - Summer (DST): UTC-6 (MDT)
- ZIP code: 84664
- Area codes: 385, 801
- FIPS code: 49-47950
- GNIS feature ID: 2411029
- Website: mapleton.org

Mapleton is a city in Utah County, Utah, United States. It is part of the Provo–Orem Metropolitan Statistical Area. The population was 11,365 at the 2020 census.

== History ==
The area was first settled in 1850, and for a time was known as Union Bench. It started as an agricultural extension of Springville. In 1901, Malepton formally became a town and separated from Springville in a dispute over water rights. Mapleton became a city in 1948.

== Demographics ==
Historical population
Census	Pop.	Note	%±
1900	584		—
1910	534		−8.6%
1920	586		9.7%
1930	663		13.1%
1940	907		36.8%
1950	1,175		29.5%
1960	1,516		29.0%
1970	1,980		30.6%
1980	2,726		37.7%
1990	3,572		31.0%
2000	5,809		62.6%
2010	7,979		37.4%
2020	11,365		42.4%
U.S. Decennial Census

=== 2020 census ===
As of the 2020 census, Mapleton had a population of 11,365. The median age was 29.7 years. 35.5% of residents were under the age of 18 and 11.9% of residents were 65 years of age or older. For every 100 females there were 103.5 males, and for every 100 females age 18 and over there were 99.1 males age 18 and over.

92.5% of residents lived in urban areas, while 7.5% lived in rural areas.

There were 2,946 households in Mapleton, of which 49.3% had children under the age of 18 living in them. Of all households, 81.1% were married-couple households, 6.4% were households with a male householder and no spouse or partner present, and 11.7% were households with a female householder and no spouse or partner present. About 9.6% of all households were made up of individuals and 6.2% had someone living alone who was 65 years of age or older.

There were 3,049 housing units, of which 3.4% were vacant. The homeowner vacancy rate was 0.8% and the rental vacancy rate was 5.5%.

Racial composition as of the 2020 census
Race	Number	Percent
White	10,479	92.2%
Black or African American	38	0.3%
American Indian and Alaska Native	41	0.4%
Asian	51	0.4%
Native Hawaiian and Other Pacific Islander	36	0.3%
Some other race	149	1.3%
Two or more races	571	5.0%
Hispanic or Latino (of any race)	507	4.5%

=== 2000 census ===
As of the 2000 census, there were 5,809 people, 1,442 households, and 1,313 families residing in the city. The population density was 629.4 people per square mile (243.0/km^{2}). There were 1,480 housing units at an average density of 160.4 per square mile (61.9/km^{2}). The racial makeup of the city was 97.80% White, 0.14% African American, 0.24% Native American, 0.34% Asian, 0.22% Pacific Islander, 0.52% from other races, and 0.74% from two or more races. Hispanic or Latino of any race were 2.05% of the population.

There were 1,442 households, out of which 54.1% had children under the age of 18 living with them, 83.8% were married couples living together, 5.1% had a female householder with no husband present, and 8.9% were non-families. 7.6% of all households were made up of individuals, and 3.7% had someone living alone who was 65 years of age or older. The average household size was 4.02 and the average family size was 4.25.

In the city, the population was spread out, with 40.1% under the age of 18, 10.0% from 18 to 24, 23.4% from 25 to 44, 18.7% from 45 to 64, and 7.8% who were 65 years of age or older. The median age was 25 years. For every 100 females, there were 100.9 males. For every 100 females age 18 and over, there were 101.0 males.

The median income for a household in the city was $60,985, and the median income for a family was $63,856. Males had a median income of $43,462 versus $22,800 for females. The per capita income for the city was $17,496. About 3.8% of families and 5.1% of the population were below the poverty line, including 6.7% of those under age 18 and 6.7% of those age 65 or over.

== Geography ==
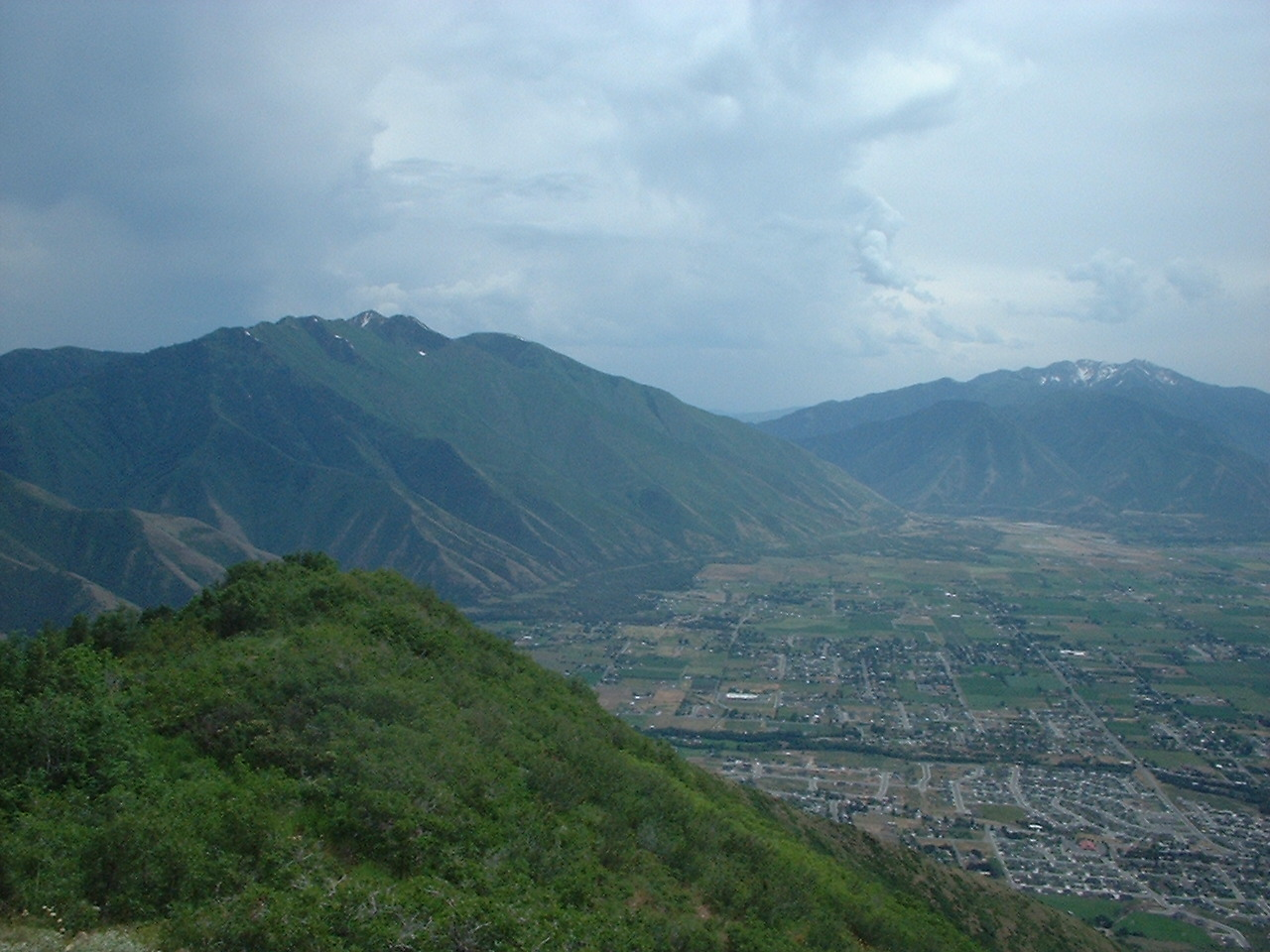
Looking down and south at east Mapleton as the base of Spanish Fork Peak (Maple Mountain), June 2004

According to the United States Census Bureau, the city has a total area of 12.6 square miles (32.6 km^{2}), all land. The community lies at an elevation of 4,700 feet (1,400 m) above sea level.

The city is dominated by 10,193-foot (3,107 m) Spanish Fork Peak to the southeast and 7,533-foot (2,296 m) Ether Peak to the northeast. Between the two mountains is Maple Canyon, which is home to Whiting Campground in the Uinta-Wasatch-Cache National Forest. Mapleton residents continue to call Spanish Fork Peak "Maple Mountain", despite the U.S. Board on Geographic Names having opted for the name that refers to the river and canyon that form its south base. The real Maple Mountain is located about 15 miles to the north, overlooking Provo. The mountain has also been informally referred to as Sierra Bonita and Monument Peak. The city is bounded to the north by Hobble Creek and extends southward to the Ensign-Bickford plant in Spanish Fork. The Mapleton Lateral Canal crosses the eastern side of the city, and the Bureau of Reclamation began piping it in 2007.

== Today ==
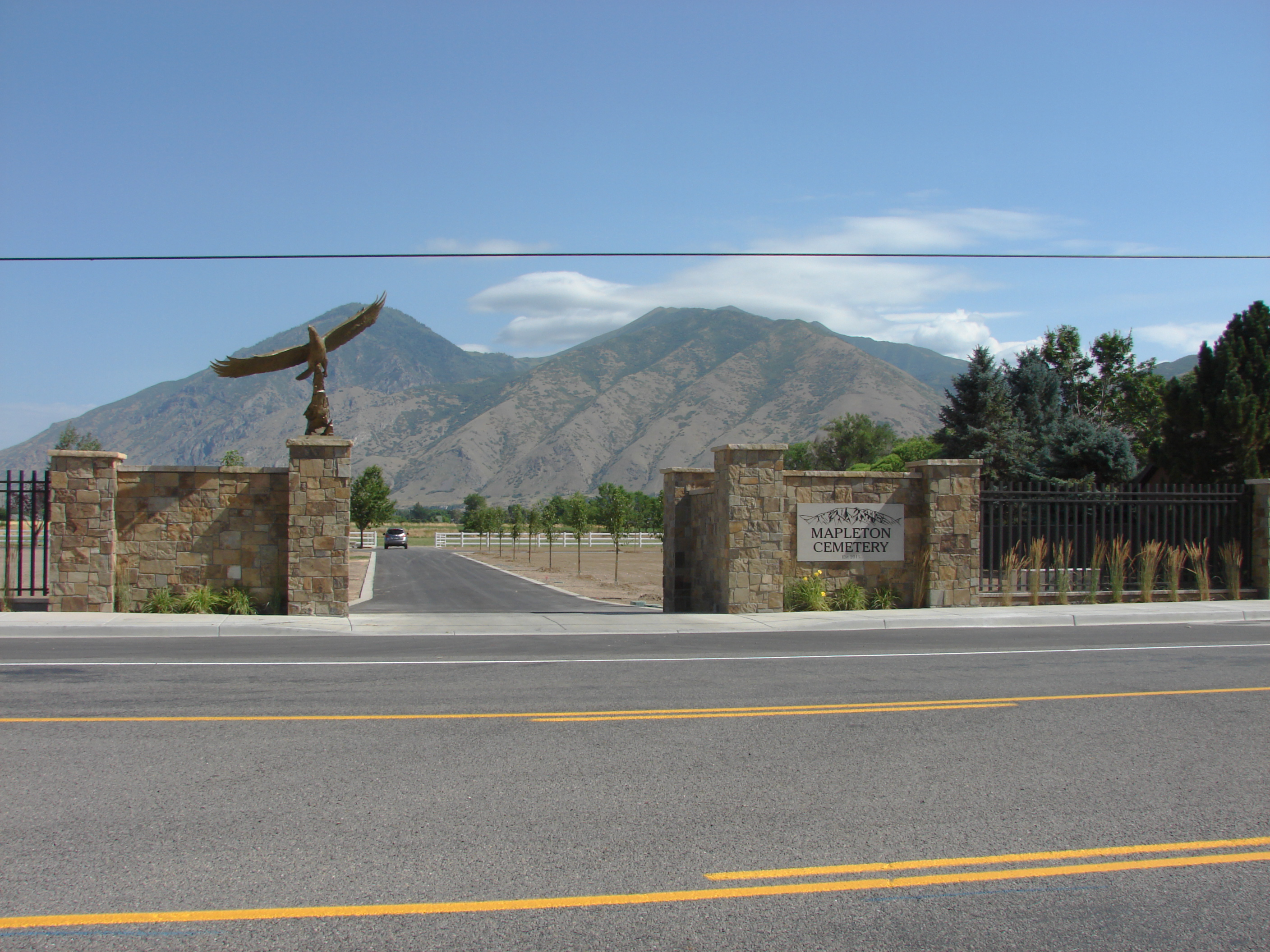
Mapleton Cemetery, July 2015

Mapleton is still a somewhat rural area but is rapidly suburbanizing in the wake of development. Numerous large subdivisions were approved in the early 2000s that recently came to fruition due to exceeding housing demand in Utah Valley. None of the city touches Interstate 15, which has kept the city more rural than neighboring Springville and Spanish Fork. The main artery through town is U.S. Route 89. Mapleton uses innovative planning techniques, including Transferable Development Rights (TDRs), to preserve the foothills. Many of the homes are located on large lots, with most minimum lot sizes ranging from one-third acre to 2 acres (8,100 m^{2}).

There are two restaurants in Mapleton - Subway, located at the intersection of Highway 89 and Maple Street, and Guadalajara Mexican Food, located at the intersection of Highway 89 and 800 North.

Parks include Mapleton City Park (southeast corner of Main and Maple streets), Ira Allen Park (northwest corner of 800 West and 2000 South), Eagle Rock Park (~800 South 800 East), North Park (~1400 West 1600 North), and Harvest Park (~2100 Harvest Parkway).

Other landmarks include the "Old White Church" (The Church of Jesus Christ of Latter-Day Saints) at the southwest corner of Main and Maple streets, the Pioneer Heritage Museum and Levi Kendall Log Cabin located at 115 South Main Street, the Mapleton City Offices, located at 125 West Community Center Way (400 North), and the Mapleton City Public Works Building (1405 West 1600 North).

== Education ==
Mapleton is served by Nebo School District. Public schools in this district that serve Mapleton residents include the following:

- Maple Mountain High School, located in nearby Spanish Fork
- Mapleton Junior High
- Hobble Creek Elementary
- Mapleton Elementary
- Maple Ridge Elementary
- Maple Grove Middle school

== Notable people ==
- David W. Allan, physicist.
- Don Bluth, filmmaker and animator
- Chris Cannon, politician
- Richard Dutcher, filmmaker, director, screenwriter, and actor
- Jaren Hall, football player.
- Travis Hansen, football player
- Wally Joyner, baseball player
- Frank C. Robertson, author

== Popular culture ==
The 2001 film Brigham City was actually filmed in Mapleton, instead of the film's namesake, Brigham City, Utah.

The Hallmark classic TV movie A Christmas Wish was filmed in Mapleton.

== See also ==
- List of cities and towns in Utah
