= Pulse-per-second signal =

Class of electrical signals

A pulse per second (PPS or 1PPS) is an electrical signal that has a width of less than one second and a sharply rising or abruptly falling edge that accurately repeats once per second. PPS signals are output by radio beacons, frequency standards, other types of precision oscillators and some GPS receivers. Precision clocks are sometimes manufactured by interfacing a PPS signal generator to processing equipment that aligns the PPS signal to the UTC second and converts it to a useful display. Atomic clocks usually have an external PPS output, although internally they may operate at 9,192,631,770 Hz. PPS signals have an accuracy ranging from 12 picoseconds to a few microseconds per second, or 2.0 nanoseconds to a few milliseconds per day based on the resolution and accuracy of the device generating the signal.

== Physical representation ==
PPS signals are usually generated as a TTL signal capable of driving a 1-kiloohm load. Some sources use line drivers in order to be capable of driving 50-ohm transmission lines. Because of the broad frequency contents, along the transmission line can have a significant impact on the shape of the PPS signal due to dispersion and after delivery effects of the dielectric of the transmission line. It is common to set t_{0} at the voltage level of the steepest slope of a PPS signal. PPS signals are therefore notoriously unreliable when time transfer accuracies better than a nanosecond are needed, although the stability of a PPS signal can reach into the picosecond regime depending on the generating device.

== Uses ==
PPS signals are used for precise timekeeping and time measurement. One increasingly common use is in computer timekeeping, including NTP. Because GPS is considered a stratum-0 source, a common use for the PPS signal is to connect it to a PC using a low-latency, low-jitter wire connection and allow a program to synchronize to it. This makes the PC a stratum-1 time source. Note that because the PPS signal does not specify the time, but merely the start of a second, one must combine the PPS functionality with another time source that provides the full date and time in order to ascertain the time both accurately and precisely.

== See also ==
- Clock signal
- Inter-Range Instrumentation Group (IRIG) time codes
- Precise Time and Time Interval (PTTI)
- Square wave
- Timecode
