= I. I. Rabi Award =

American award for atomic and molecular frequency standards

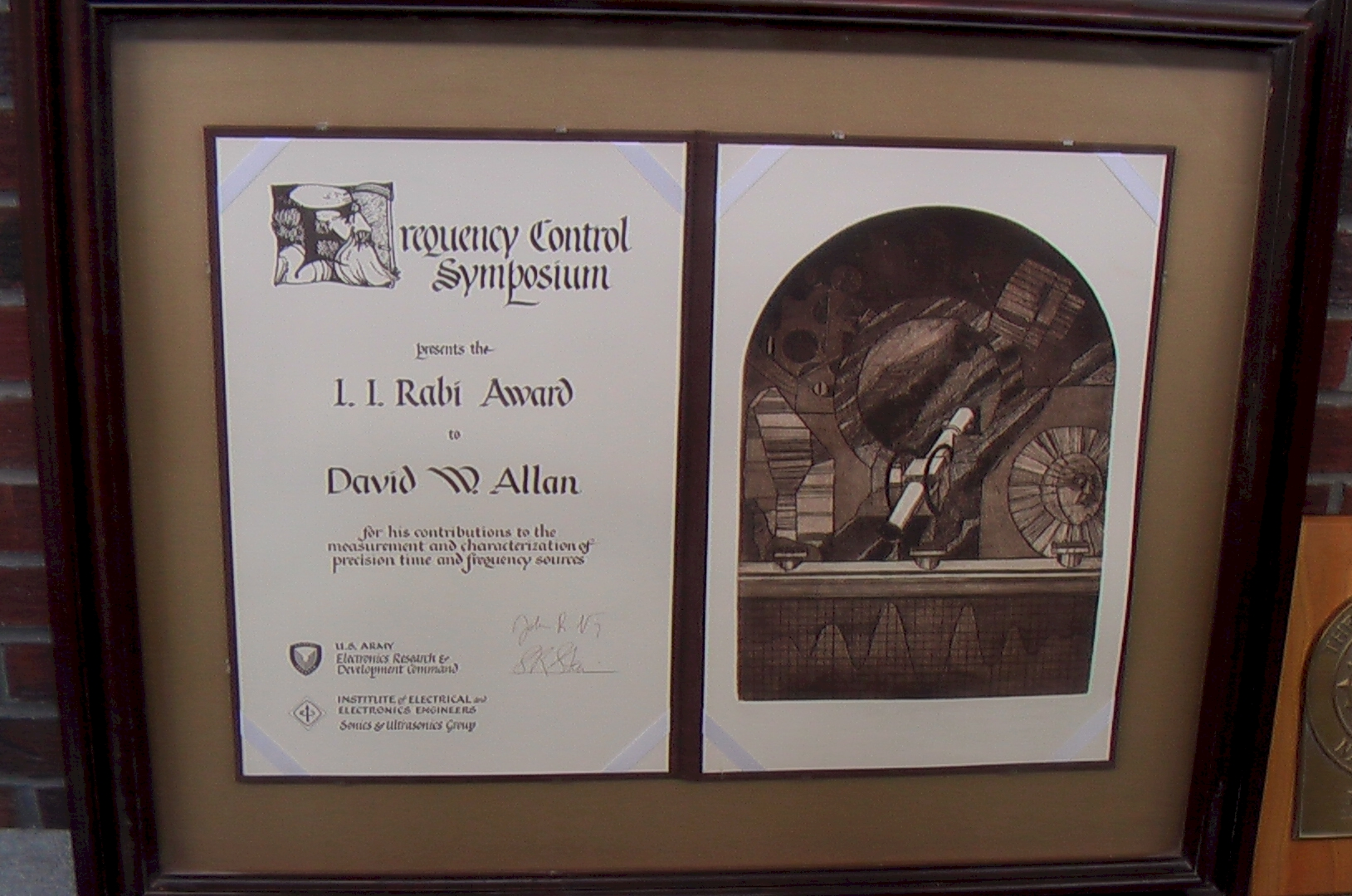
Photo of I. I. Rabi Award given in 1984 to David W. Allan, the second to receive it after Rabi.

The I. I. Rabi Award, founded in 1983, is awarded annually by IEEE.

"The Rabi Award is to recognize outstanding contributions related to the fields of atomic and molecular frequency standards, and time transfer and dissemination."

The award is named after Isidor Isaac Rabi, Nobel Prize winner in 1944. He was the first recipient of the award, for his experimental and theoretical work on atomic beam resonance spectroscopy.

== Recipients ==
- 1983 - I. I. Rabi
- 1984 - David W. Allan
- 1985 - Norman Ramsey, Nobel Prize in 1989
- 1986 - Jerrold R. Zacharias
- 1987 - Louis Essen
- 1988 - Gernot M. R. Winkler
- 1989 - Leonard S. Cutler
- 1990 - Claude Audoin
- 1991 - Andrea De Marchi
- 1992 - James A. Barnes
- 1993 - Robert F. C. Vessot
- 1994 - Jacques Vanier
- 1995 - Fred L. Walls
- 1996 - Andre Clairon and Robert E. Drullinger
- 1997 - Harry E. Peters and Nikolai A. Demidov
- 1998 - David J. Wineland, Nobel Prize in 2012
- 1999 - Bernard Guinot
- 2000 - William J. Riley Jr.
- 2001 - Lute Maleki
- 2002 - Jon H. Shirley
- 2003 - Andreas Bauch
- 2005 - Theodor W. Hänsch, Nobel Prize in 2005
- 2004 - John L. Hall, Nobel Prize in 2005
- 2006 - James C. Bergquist
- 2007 - Patrick Gill and Leo Hollberg
- 2008 - Hidetoshi Katori
- 2009 - John D. Prestage
- 2010 - Long Sheng Ma
- 2011 - Fritz Riehle
- 2012 - James Camparo
- 2013 - Judah Levine
- 2014 - Harald R. Telle
- 2015 - Ulrich L. Rohde
- 2016 - John Kitching
- 2017 - Scott Diddams
- 2018 - Jun Ye
- 2019 - Steven Jefferts
- 2020 - Robert Lutwak
- 2021 - Ekkehard Peik

== See also ==
- List of physics awards
