= Leeson's equation =

Expression concerning electronic oscillators

Leeson's equation is an empirical expression that describes an oscillator's phase noise spectrum.

Leeson's expression for single-sideband (SSB) phase noise in dBc/Hz (decibels relative to output level per hertz) and augmented for flicker noise:

$$L(f_\text{m}) = 10 \log_{10} \bigg[ \frac{2FkT}{P_s} \bigg( \bigg(\frac{f_0}{2 Q_\text{l} f_\text{m}}\bigg)^2 + 1\bigg)\bigg(\frac{f_\text{c}}{f_\text{m}} + 1\bigg) \bigg]$$

where f_{0} is the output frequency, Q_{l} is the loaded quality factor, f_{m} is the offset from the output frequency (Hz), f_{c} is the 1/f corner frequency, F is the noise factor of the amplifier, k is the Boltzmann constant, T is absolute temperature, and P_{s} is the available power at the sustaining amplifier input.

There is often misunderstanding around Leeson's equation, even in text books. In the 1966 paper, Leeson stated correctly that "P_{s} is the signal level at the oscillator active element input" (often referred to as the power through the resonator now, strictly speaking it is the available power at the amplifier input). F is the device noise factor, however this does need to be measured at the operating power level. The common misunderstanding, that P_{s} is the oscillator output level, may result from derivations that are not completely general. In 1982, W. P. Robins (IEE Publication "Phase noise in signal sources") correctly showed that the Leeson equation (in the −20 dB/decade region) is not just an empirical rule, but a result that follows from a linear analysis of an oscillator circuit. However, a used constraint in his circuit was that the oscillator output power was approximately equal to the active device input power.

The Leeson equation is presented in various forms. In the above equation, if f_{c} is set to zero the equation represents a linear analysis of a feedback oscillator in the general case (and flicker noise is not included), it is for this that Leeson is most recognised, showing a −20 dB/decade of offset frequency slope. If used correctly, the Leeson equation gives a useful prediction of oscillator performance in this range. If a value for f_{c} is included, the equation also shows a curve fit for the flicker noise. The f_{c} for an amplifier depends on the actual configuration used, because radio-frequency and low-frequency negative feedback can have an effect on f_{c}. So for accurate results, f_{c} must be determined from added noise measurements on the amplifier using R.F., with the actual circuit configuration to be used in the oscillator.

Evidence that P_{s} is the amplifier input power (often contradicted or very unclear in text books) can be found in the derivation in further reading which also shows experimental results, "Enrico Rubiola, The Leeson Effect" also shows this in a different form.
