= Modified Allan variance =

Variable bandwidth variant of Allan variance

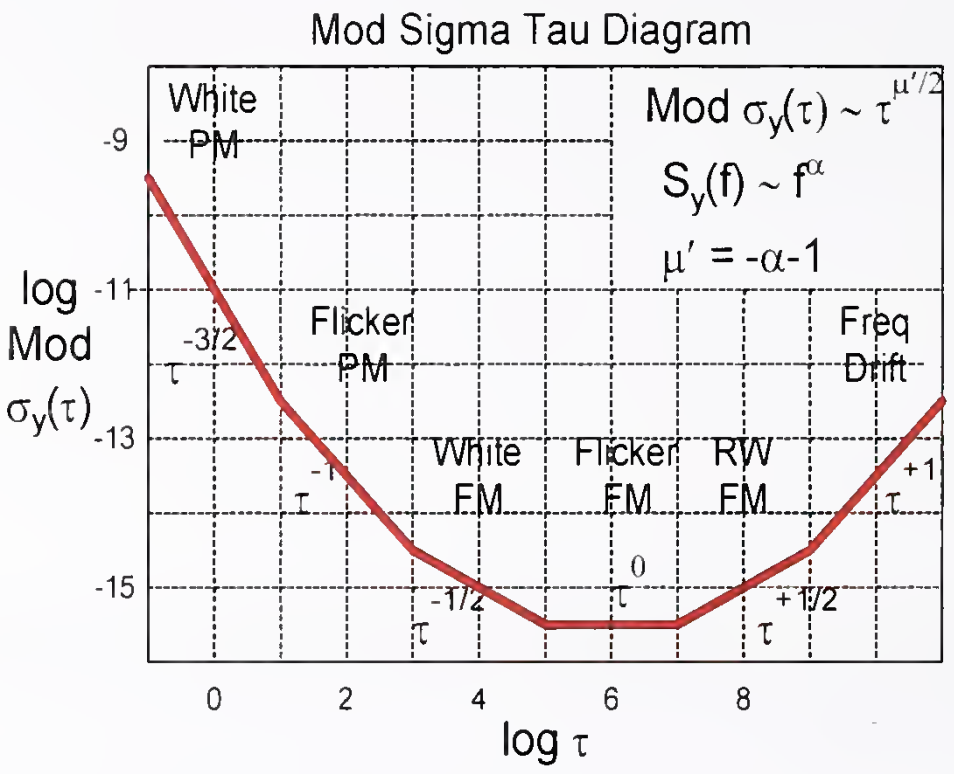
Diagram of modified Allan deviation as a function of averaging time, showing the 6 typical regimes. 0. White phase-modulation noise (PM): At the highest frequency, white phase noise dominates. This corresponds to $\sigma(\tau) \propto \tau^{-3/2}, S[f] = f^3$. 1. Flicker phase-modulation noise (PM): at a lower frequency, flicker phase noise dominates. This corresponds to $\sigma(\tau) \propto \tau^{-1}, S[f] = f^2$. 2. White frequency-modulation noise (FM): at a lower frequency, white noise in frequency dominates. This corresponds to $\sigma(\tau) \propto \tau^{-1/2}, S[f] = f^0$ 3. Flicker FM: $\sigma(\tau) \propto \tau^0, S[f] \propto f^{-1}$. This is also called "pink noise". 4. Random Walk FM: $\sigma(\tau) \propto \tau^{+1/2}, S[f] \propto f^{-2}$. This is also called "brown noise" or "brownian noise". In this regime, the frequency of the system executes a random walk. In other words, $df/dt$ becomes a white noise. 5. Frequency drift: $\sigma(\tau) \propto \tau^{+1}, S[f] \propto f^{-3}$. In this regime, the frequency of the system executes a pink noise walk. In other words, $df/dt$ becomes a pink noise.

The modified Allan variance (MVAR), also known as mod σ_{y}^{2}(τ), is a variable bandwidth modified variant of Allan variance, a measurement of frequency stability in clocks, oscillators and amplifiers. Its main advantage relative to Allan variance is its ability to separate white phase noise from flicker phase noise.

The modified Allan deviation (MDEV), also known as mod σ_{y}(τ), is the deviation variant of the modified Allan variance.

== Background ==
The Allan variance has a drawback in that it is unable to separate the white phase modulation (WPM) from the flicker phase modulation (FPM). Looking at their response to Power-law noise it is clearly seen that WPM and FPM have almost the same response to tau, but WPM is linearly sensitive to the system bandwidth f_{H} whereas FPM is only weakly dependent on it. Thus, by varying the system bandwidth the WPM and FPM noise forms may be separated. However, it is impractical to alter the hardware of the measurement system. By post-processing the sample-series and implementing a software bandwidth a modified Allan variance measure can be given capable of resolving the noise forms.

== Definition ==
The modified Allan variance is defined for using time error samples as

$$\operatorname{mod}\sigma_y^2(n\tau_0) = \frac{1}{2\tau^2}\left\langle \left[ \frac{1}{n}\sum_{i=0}^{n-1}x_{i+2n}-2x_{i+n}+x_i\right]^2 \right\rangle$$

or with average fractional frequency time series and τ = nτ_{0}

$$\operatorname{mod}\sigma_y^2(n\tau_0) = \frac{1}{2}\left\langle \left[ \frac{1}{n}\sum_{i=0}^{n-1}\bar{y}_{i+n}-\bar{y}_i\right]^2 \right\rangle ,$$

where n is the integer number of samples averaged over.

== Estimators ==
The modified Allan variance estimator for time error time series is

$$\operatorname{mod}\sigma_y^2(n\tau_0) = \frac{1}{2n^4\tau_0^2(N-3n+1)}\sum_{j=0}^{N-3n} \left\{ \sum_{i=j}^{j+n-1} x_{i+2n}-2x_{i+n}+x_i\right\}^2$$

or with fractional frequency time series

$$\operatorname{mod}\sigma_y^2(n\tau_0) = \frac{1}{2n^4(M-3n+2)}\sum_{j=0}^{M-3n+1} \left\{ \sum_{i=j}^{j+n-1} \left( \sum_{k=i}^{i+n-1} y_{k+n} - y_k\right) \right\}^2$$
