= Precise Time and Time Interval =

Standard for highly accurate timing information

Precise Time and Time Interval (PTTI) is a Department of Defense military and Global Positioning System standard which details a mechanism and waveform for distributing highly accurate timing information.

It is similar to pulse per second (PPS) because it indicates the start of each second using a pulse. PTTI also provides the full Time Of Day (TOD) in hours, minutes, and seconds.

== See also ==
- Clock signal
- Inter-Range Instrumentation Group (IRIG) time codes
- Pulse Per Second (PPS) (1PPS)
- Square wave
- Timecode
