= Berkeley Nucleonics Corporation =

American electronics company

Berkeley Nucleonics Corporation (BNC) of San Rafael, California, United States, is an electronics company whose products range from pulse generators and digital delay generators to specialized handheld instruments and portal monitors capable of radiation detection and isotope identification.

== History ==
Berkeley Nucleonics Corporation (BNC) is a manufacturer of precision electronic instrumentation for test, measurement, and nuclear research. Founded in 1963, its corporate headquarters are in San Rafael, California, with additional manufacturing facilities and sales offices throughout the United States. BNC also maintains an international network of manufacturer's representatives—including Optilas, Canberra Packard, ORTEC, Coherent, and Seiko—to provide for precision instrumentation needs globally.

BNC initially developed custom pulse generators. It became known for meeting stringent requirements for high precision and stability, and for producing instruments of reliability and performance.

BNC continues to develop custom pulse, signal, light, and function generators. Its designs incorporate the latest innovations in software and hardware engineering, surface mount production, and automated testing procedures. The Model 625A function generator was the recipient of several electronics industry awards, including the Cahners Electronics Group's" T&M Product of the Year" award for 1999.

BNC is also known for its digital delay generators (DDGs) line. To date, BNC has introduced 15 different DDGs with delay resolution as low as 250 femtoseconds. Annual media surveys consistently rank BNC in the top echelon of producers of DDGs.

In the mid-1990s, BNC created the Nuclear Products Group to develop radiation detection and analysis instrumentation. In 1997, it introduced the SAM 935 Surveillance and Measurement system, the first real-time analysis tool for identifying and quantifying multiple radionuclides. BNC's nuclear spectroscopy products are used by industries involved in environmental monitoring, health physics, emergency response, and power generation. It also offers an accredited program of training seminars in radiation detection, surveillance, and measurement at locations across the US and online, providing attendees with an understanding of principles and techniques for isotope identification and analysis. BNC was also a co-sponsor of a training seminar on radiological detection for emergency response and anti-terrorism with Lawrence Livermore National Laboratory in the fall of 2002.

BNC was recognized in 2010 by the US Department of Energy (Hanford Site) and the US Department of Defense for its isotope identification technology. Systems were deployed for field measurements both in man-portable and vehicle-based applications. The Department of Defense also adopted the technology after testing and evaluating large-scale deployments.

BNC responded to the Fukushima accident in 2011 by sending products, trainers, and technicians to Japan to work with partners to develop processes for radiation screening. BNC received recognition from private organizations and governmental agencies in Japan and the US for its contribution to the screening and cleanup processes. BNC staff worked with Japanese agencies to translate support documentation and radiation safety training materials into Japanese, allowing non-technical personal radiation detectors (PRDs) users to understand the concepts of radiation detection and background measurements.

Also, in 2011, BNC launched BNC Scientific, a new division to support customers' complex applications with some of the most advanced products in the industry. BNC Scientific operates as a manufacturer's representative for technologies in microwave signal generation, lock-in amplifiers, spectrum analyzers, and high-frequency arbitrary waveform generators.

In 2012, BNC began the development of its line of RF/Microwave Signal Generators, Signal Analyzers, and Spectrum Analysis tools to address industry growth in communications and data requirements.

== Products ==
Berkeley Nucleonics Corporation sells several products, including:

Electronic Products

- Digital delay generators
- Pulse generators - Optical and Electrical
- BNC 575 digital delay/pulse generator
- NIM Pulse Generators - (Nuclear Instrumentation Modules)
- Arbitrary waveform generators and Function generators

Radiation Products

- Handheld radiation detection
- Isotope identification
- Portal and vehicle-based systems
- Networked radiation equipment
