= Function generator =

Electronic test equipment used to generate electrical waveforms

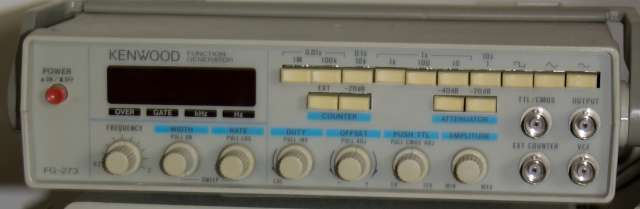
A simple analog function generator, circa 1990

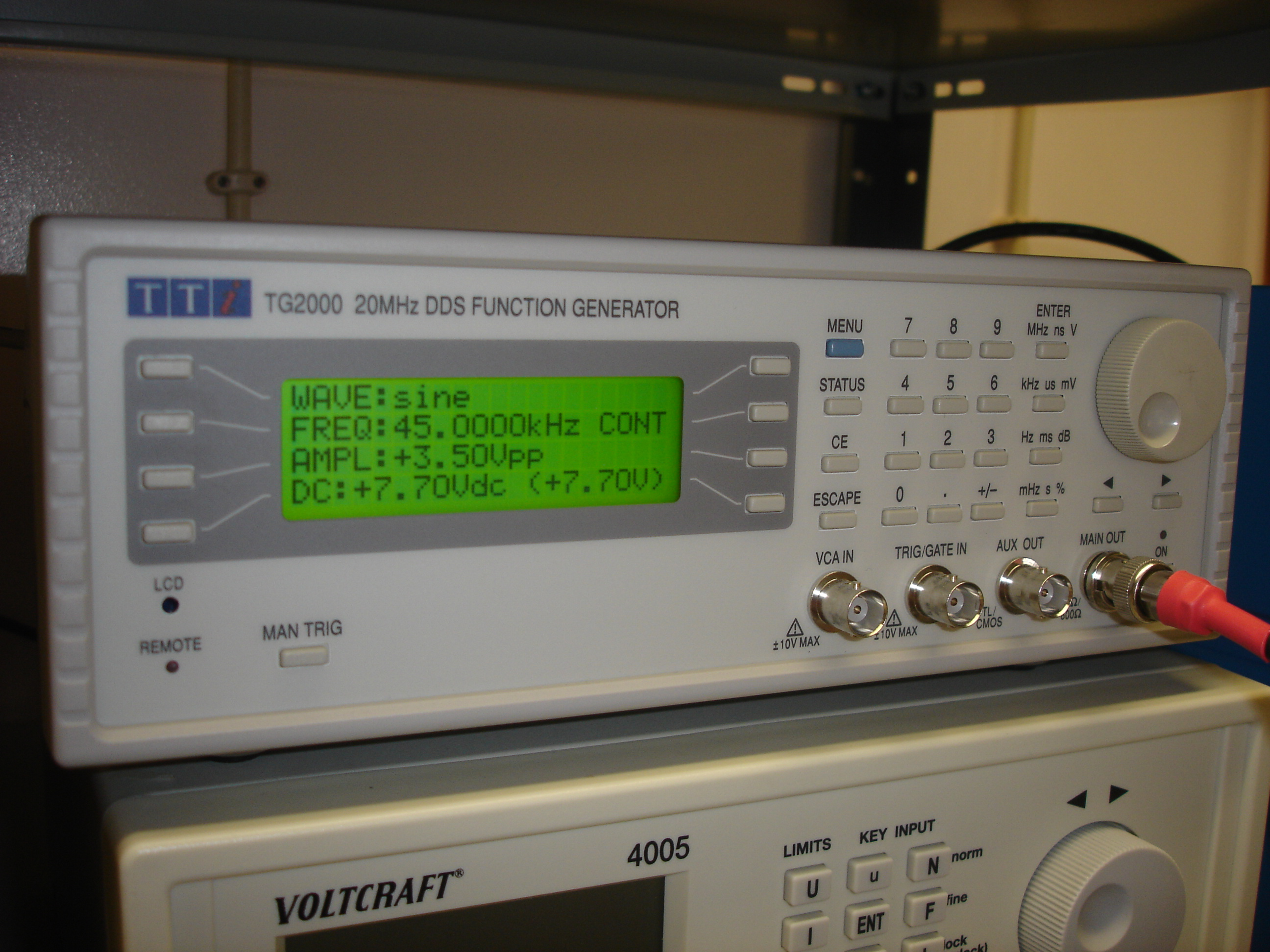
A DDS function generator

Sine, square, triangle, and sawtooth waveforms

In electrical engineering, a function generator is usually a piece of electronic test equipment or software used to generate different types of electrical waveforms over a wide range of frequencies. Some of the most common waveforms produced by the function generator are the sine wave, square wave, triangular wave and sawtooth shapes. These waveforms can be either repetitive or single-shot (which requires an internal or external trigger source). Another feature included on many function generators is the ability to add a DC offset. Integrated circuits used to generate waveforms may also be described as function generator ICs.

Although function generators cover both audio and radio frequencies, they are usually not suitable for applications that need low distortion or stable frequency signals. When those traits are required, other signal generators would be more appropriate.

Some function generators can be phase-locked to an external signal source (which may be a frequency reference) or another function generator.

Function generators are used in the development, test and repair of electronic equipment. For example, they may be used as a signal source to test amplifiers or to introduce an error signal into a control loop. Function generators are primarily used for working with analog circuits, related pulse generators are primarily used for working with digital circuits.

== Electronic instruments ==
=== Principles of Operation ===
Simple function generators usually generate triangular waveform whose frequency can be controlled smoothly as well as in steps. This triangular wave is used as the basis for all of its other outputs. The triangular wave is generated by repeatedly charging and discharging a capacitor from a constant current source. This produces a linearly ascending and descending voltage ramp. As the output voltage reaches upper or lower limits, the charging or discharging is reversed using a comparator, producing the linear triangle wave. By varying the current and the size of the capacitor, different frequencies may be obtained. Sawtooth waves can be produced by charging the capacitor slowly with low current, but using a diode over the current source to discharge quickly - the polarity of the diode changes the polarity of the resulting sawtooth, i.e. slow rise and fast fall, or fast rise and slow fall.

A 50% duty cycle square wave is easily obtained by noting whether the capacitor is being charged or discharged, which is reflected in the current switching comparator output. Other duty cycles (theoretically from 0% to 100%) can be obtained by using a comparator and the sawtooth or triangle signal. Most function generators also contain a non-linear diode shaping circuit that can convert the triangle wave into a reasonably accurate sine wave by rounding off the corners of the triangle wave in a process similar to clipping in audio systems.

A walking ring counter, also called a Johnson counter, and a (linear) resistor-only shaping circuit is an alternative way to produce an approximation of a sine wave. This is perhaps the simplest numerically-controlled oscillator. Two such walking ring counters are perhaps the simplest way to generate the continuous-phase frequency-shift keying used in dual-tone multi-frequency signaling and early modem tones.

A typical function generator can provide frequencies up to 20 MHz. RF generators for higher frequencies are not function generators in the strict sense since they typically produce pure or modulated sine signals only.

Function generators, like most signal generators, may also contain an attenuator, various means of modulating the output waveform, and often the ability to automatically and repetitively "sweep" the frequency of the output waveform (by means of a voltage-controlled oscillator) between two operator-determined limits. This capability makes it very easy to evaluate the frequency response of a given electronic circuit.

Some function generators can also generate white or pink noise.

More advanced function generators are called arbitrary waveform generators (AWG). They use direct digital synthesis (DDS) techniques to generate any waveform that can be described by a table of amplitudes and time steps.

=== Specifications ===
Typical specifications for a general-purpose function generator are:

- Produces sine, square, triangular, sawtooth (ramp), and pulse output. Arbitrary waveform generators can produce waves of any shape.
- It can generate a wide range of frequencies. For example, the Tektronix FG 502 (ca 1974) covers 0.1 Hz to 11 MHz.
- Frequency stability of 0.1 percent per hour for analog generators or 500 ppm for a digital generator.
- Maximum sinewave distortion of about 1% (accuracy of diode shaping network) for analog generators. Arbitrary waveform generators may have distortion less than -55 dB below 50 kHz and less than -40 dB above 50 kHz.
- Some function generators can be phase locked to an external signal source, which may be a frequency reference or another function generator.
- Amplitude modulation (AM), frequency modulation (FM), or phase modulation (PM) may be supported.
- Output amplitude up to 10 V peak-to-peak.
- Amplitude can be modified, usually by a calibrated attenuator with decade steps and continuous adjustment within each decade.
- Some generators provide a DC offset voltage, e.g. adjustable between -5V to +5V.
- An output impedance of 50 Ω.

=== Software ===
A completely different approach to function generation is to use software instructions to generate a waveform, with provision for output. For example, a general-purpose digital computer can be used to generate the waveform; if frequency range and amplitude are acceptable, the sound card fitted to most computers can be used to output the generated wave.

== Circuit elements ==
=== Waveform generator ===
An electronic circuit element used for generating waveforms within other apparatus that can be used in communications and instrumentation circuits, and also in a function generator instrument. Examples are the Exar XR2206 and the Intersil ICL8038 integrated circuits, which can generate sine, square, triangle, ramp, and pulse waveforms at a voltage-controllable frequency.

=== Function generator ===
An electronic circuit element that provides an output proportional to some mathematical function (such as the square root) of its input; such devices are used in feedback control systems and in analog computers. Examples are the Raytheon QK329 square-law tube and the Intersil ICL8048 Log/Antilog Amplifier.

== See also ==
- Digital pattern generator
- Electronic musical instrument
- Wavetek
