= Digital pattern generator =

Electronic test equipment that generates digital stimuli

A digital pattern generator is a piece of electronic test equipment or software used to generate digital electronic stimuli. Digital electronics stimuli are a specific kind of electrical waveform varying between two conventional voltages that correspond to two logic states ("low state" and "high state", "0" and "1"). The main purpose of a digital pattern generator is to stimulate the inputs of a digital electronic device. For that reason, the voltage levels generated by a digital pattern generator are often compatible with digital electronics I/O standards – TTL, LVTTL, LVCMOS and LVDS, for instance.

Digital pattern generators are sometimes referred to as "pulse generator" or "pulse pattern generator" which may be able to function as digital pattern generators as well. Hence, the distinction between the two types of equipment may not be clear. A digital pattern generator is a source of synchronous digital stimulus; the generated signal is interesting for testing digital electronics at the logic level - this is why they are also called "logic source". A pulse generator is of purpose to generate an electrical pulse of different shapes; they are mostly used for tests at an electrical or analog level. Another common name for such equipment is "digital logic source" or "logic source".

Digital pattern generators can produce either repetitive, or single-shot signals in which case some kind of triggering source is required (internal or external).

== Types of digital pattern generators ==
Digital pattern generators are today available as stand-alone units, add-on hardware modules for other equipment such as a [logic analyzer] or as PC-based equipment.

Stand-alone units are self-contained devices that include everything from the user interface to define the patterns that should be generated to the electronic equipment that actually generates the output signal.

Some test equipment manufacturers propose pattern generators as add-on modules for logic analyzers (see for example the PG3A module for Tektronix' TLA7000 series of logic analyzers or Hewlett-Packard 16520A/16522A modules for 16500-series of logic analyzers). In this case, the pattern generator is the "generation counterpart" to the analysis functionality offered by logic analyzers.

PC-based digital pattern generators are connected to a PC through peripheral ports such as PCI, USB, and/or Ethernet (see, for example, the "Wave Generator Xpress" from Byte Paradigm, connected through USB). They use the PC as a user interface for defining and storing the digital patterns to be sent.

== Features ==
Digital pattern generators are primarily characterized by a number of digital channels, a maximum rate and the supported voltage standards.

- The number of digital channels defines the maximum width of any pattern generated - typically, 8-bit, 16-bit, or 32-bit pattern generator. A 16-bit pattern generator is able to generate arbitrary digital samples on any number of bits from 1 to 16.
- The maximum rate defines the minimum time interval between 2 successive patterns. For instance, a 50 MHz (50 MSample/s) digital pattern generator is able to output a new pattern every 20 nanoseconds.
- The supported voltage standards ultimately define the set of electronic devices a digital pattern generator can be used with. Concretely, the voltages and the transition characteristics of the signal at the output of the digital pattern generator will be compliant to these voltage standards. Examples of supported voltage standards: TTL, LVTTL, LVCMOS, LVDS.

Most digital pattern generator add features such as the ability to generate a repetitive sequence or a digital clock signal at a specified frequency, the ability to use an external clock input and triggering options, to start pattern generation upon the reception of an event from an external input.

== Common applications ==
- Digital electronics and embedded system testing and debugging
- Stimulation of digital signal processing hardware
- Digital-to-analog converter stimulation

== Special purpose digital pattern generators ==
Video digital pattern generators are digital pattern generators dedicated to the generation of a specific test pattern in one particular digital video format, such as DVI or HDMI.

In safety-critical technology such as automotive, specialized electronic systems are involved in keeping its correct functioning. These can be used to monitor brakes, motors, and airbags. Internal testing is undertaken for these electronic systems by pattern generators, i.e., LFSR that feeds the circuit under test, verifying output correctness.

== Manufacturers of digital pattern generators ==
- Berkeley Nucleonics
- Chroma
- Keysight (formerly Agilent and HP)
- National Instruments
- Tektronix
- Active Technologies

== See also ==
- Arbitrary waveform generator
- Pulse generator
- Signal generator
