= Numerically controlled oscillator =

Digital signal generator

A numerically controlled oscillator (NCO) is a digital signal generator which creates a synchronous (i.e., clocked), discrete-time, discrete-valued representation of a waveform, usually sinusoidal. NCOs are often used in conjunction with a digital-to-analog converter (DAC) at the output to create a direct digital synthesizer (DDS).

Numerically controlled oscillators offer several advantages over other types of oscillators in terms of agility, accuracy, stability and reliability. NCOs are used in many communications systems including digital up/down converters used in 3G wireless and software radio systems, digital phase-locked loops, radar systems, drivers for optical or acoustic transmissions, and multilevel FSK/PSK modulators/demodulators.

== Operation ==
An NCO generally consists of two parts:

- A phase accumulator (PA), which sums an input frequency control word to its stored output value (the "phase word") every clock cycle.
- A phase-to-amplitude converter (PAC), which maps the phase word to a corresponding amplitude value. This mapping is typically implemented by using the phase word as an address for a waveform look-up table (LUT). Sometimes interpolation is used with the look-up table to provide better accuracy and reduce phase error noise. Other mapping methods, including mathematical algorithms such as power series may be used, particularly in software NCOs.

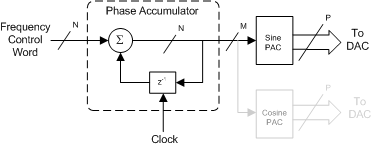
Figure 1: Numerically controlled oscillator with optional quadrature output

When clocked, the phase accumulator (PA) outputs a sequence of samples from a modulo-2^{N} sawtooth waveform, which are converted by the phase-to-amplitude converter (PAC) to sinusoid samples, where N is the number of bits carried in the phase accumulator. N sets the NCO frequency resolution and is normally much larger than the address width of the PAC look-up table. For a PAC address width of M, the PA output word must be truncated to M bits as shown in Figure 1. However, the truncated bits can be used for interpolation. Truncation of the phase output word does not affect frequency accuracy, but it does produce a time-varying, periodic phase error, which is a primary source of spurious products. Spurious products also result from the finite word length of the PAC output (amplitude) word.

The frequency accuracy relative to the clock frequency is limited only by the precision of the arithmetic used to compute the phase. NCOs are phase- and frequency-agile, and can be trivially modified to produce a phase-modulated or frequency-modulated output by summation at the appropriate node, or provide quadrature outputs as shown in the figure.

== Phase accumulator ==
A binary phase accumulator consists of an N-bit binary adder and a register configured as shown in Figure 1. Each clock cycle produces a new N-bit output consisting of the previous output obtained from the register summed with the frequency control word (FCW) which is constant for a given output frequency. The resulting output waveform is a staircase with step size $\Delta F$, the integer value of the FCW. In some configurations the phase output is taken from the output of the register, which introduces a one clock cycle latency but allows the adder to operate at a higher clock rate.

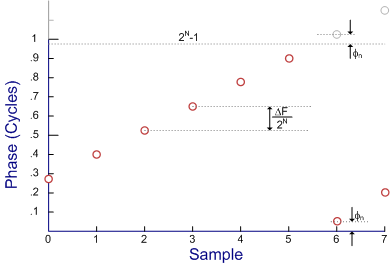
Figure 2: Normalized phase accumulator output

The adder is designed to overflow when the sum of the absolute value of its operands exceeds its capacity (2^{N}−1). The overflow bit is discarded so the output word width is always equal to its input word width. The remainder $\phi _n$, called the residual, is stored in the register and the cycle repeats, starting this time from $\phi _n$ (see figure 2). Since a phase accumulator is a finite-state machine, eventually the residual at some sample K must return to the initial value $\phi _0$. The interval K is referred to as the grand repetition rate (GRR) given by

$$\mbox{GRR}=\frac{2^N}{\mbox{GCD}(\Delta F,2^N)}$$

where GCD is the greatest common divisor function. The GRR represents the true periodicity for a given $\Delta F$ which for a high resolution NCO can be very long. Usually we are more interested in the operating frequency determined by the average overflow rate, given by

$F_{out} = \frac{\Delta F}{2^N}F_{clock}$ (1)

The frequency resolution, defined as the smallest possible incremental change in frequency, is given by

$F_{res} = \frac{F_{clock}}{2^N}$ (2)

Equation (1) shows that the phase accumulator can be thought of as a programmable non-integer frequency divider of divide ratio $\Delta F/2^N$.

== Phase-to-amplitude converter ==
The phase-amplitude converter creates the sample-domain waveform from the truncated phase output word received from the PA. The PAC can be a simple read-only memory containing 2^{M} contiguous samples of the desired output waveform which typically is a sinusoid. Often, though, various tricks are employed to reduce the amount of memory required. This include various trigonometric expansions, trigonometric approximations and methods which take advantage of the quadrature symmetry exhibited by sinusoids. Alternatively, the PAC may consist of random access memory which can be filled as desired to create an arbitrary waveform generator.

== Spurious products ==
Spurious products are the result of harmonic or non-harmonic distortion in the creation of the output waveform due to non-linear numerical effects in the signal processing chain. Only numerical errors are covered here. For other distortion mechanisms created in the digital-to-analog converter, see the corresponding section in the direct-digital synthesizer article.

=== Phase truncation spurs ===
The number of phase accumulator bits of an NCO (N) is usually between 16 and 64. If the PA output word were used directly to index the PAC look-up table, an untenably high storage capacity in the ROM would be required. As such, the PA output word must be truncated to span a reasonable memory space. Truncation of the phase word causes phase modulation of the output sinusoid, which introduces non-harmonic distortion in proportion to the number of bits truncated. The number of spurious products created by this distortion is given by:

$n_W=\frac{2^W}{\mbox{GCD}(\Delta F,2^W)}-1$ (3)

where W is the number of bits truncated.

In calculating the spurious-free dynamic range, we are interested in the spurious product with the largest amplitude relative to the carrier output level given by:

$$\zeta _{max}=2^{-M} \frac{\pi \mbox{GCD}(\Delta F,2^W)}{\sin \left( \pi \cdot 2^{-P}\mbox{GCD}(\Delta F,2^W) \right)}$$

where P is the size of the phase-to-amplitude converter's lookup table in bits, i.e., M in Figure 1. For W > 4,

$$\zeta _{max} \approx -6.02 \cdot P\;\mbox{dBc}.$$

Another related spurious generation method is the slight modulation due to the GRR outlined above. The amplitude of these spurs is low for large N and their frequency is generally too low to be detectable but they may cause issues for some applications.

One way to reduce the truncation in the address lookup is to have several smaller lookup tables in parallel and use the upper bits to index into the tables and the lower bits to weigh them for linear or quadratic interpolation. I.e., use a 24-bit phase accumulator to look up into two 16-bit LUTS. Address into the truncated 16 MSBs, and that plus 1. Linearly interpolate using the 8 LSBs as weights. (One could instead use 3 LUTs and quadratically interpolate). This can result in decreased distortion for the same amount of memory at the cost of some multipliers.

=== Amplitude truncation spurs ===
Another source of spurious products is the amplitude quantization of the sampled waveform contained in the PAC look-up table(s). If the number of DAC bits is P, the AM spur level is approximately equal to −6.02 P − 1.76 dBc.

=== Mitigation techniques ===
Phase truncation spurs can be reduced substantially by the introduction of white Gaussian noise prior to truncation. The so-called dither noise is summed into the lower W+1 bits of the PA output word to linearize the truncation operation. Often, the improvement can be achieved without penalty because the DAC noise floor tends to dominate system performance. Amplitude truncation spurs can not be mitigated in this fashion. Introduction of noise into the static values held in the PAC ROMs would not eliminate the cyclicality of the truncation error terms and thus would not achieve the desired effect.

== See also ==
- Direct digital synthesis (DDS)
- Digital-to-analog converter (DAC)
- Digitally controlled oscillator (DCO)
