= Stanford Research =

Stanford Research may refer to:

- Stanford Research Institute or SRI International, a nonprofit scientific research institute and organization headquartered in Menlo Park, California,
- Stanford Research Systems, a maker of general test and measurement instruments located at Sunnyvale, California.

See also

- Stanford University
- Stanford (disambiguation)
