= W&G =

W&G may refer to:

- Wallace & Gromit, British television programme
- Will & Grace, American situation comedy
- W&G Records, Australian company
- Wandel & Goltermann, owners of Wavetek
