= Agnieszka Kończykowska =

Polish electronics engineer

Agnieszka D. Kończykowska is a Polish electronics engineer specializing in the design of electronic circuits, especially for applications in telecommunications.

== Education and career ==
Kończykowska was a student at the Warsaw University of Technology, where she earned a master's degree in applied mathematics in 1971 and completed a Ph.D. in electrical engineering in 1977. From 1977 to 1981 she was a researcher on analog circuit design at the university.

In 1981 she moved to France, becoming a researcher on semiconductor devices at France Telecom. She moved to Alcatel in 1999, working there on the design of high speed analog and digital circuits including switched capacitors and microwave engineering. She moved to the III-V Lab in Paris in 2005, where since 2019 she has headed the department of microelectronic design.

She was president of the European Circuit Society from 1995 to 1999.

== Recognition ==
Kończykowska was elected as an IEEE Fellow, in the 2017 class of fellows, "for contributions to development of very high-speed circuits".
