= The Rock (soundtrack) =

The Rock (Original Motion Picture Score)

Film score by Nick Glennie-Smith, Hans Zimmer and Harry Gregson-Williams
- Released: June 7, 1996
- Studio: Sony Scoring Stage, Sony Pictures Studios, Culver City, California; Media Ventures, Santa Monica, California; Paramount Recording Studios, Los Angeles; A&M Studios, Los Angeles
- Genre: Film score
- Length: 60:29
- Label: Hollywood
- Producer: Nick Glennie-Smith; Hans Zimmer; Harry Gregson-Williams

Nick Glennie-Smith chronology
Two If by Sea (1996)	The Rock (1996)	Fire Down Below (1997)

Hans Zimmer chronology
Muppet Treasure Island (1996)	The Rock (1996)	The Fan (1996)

Harry Gregson-Williams chronology
Witness Against Hitler (1996)	The Rock (1996)	Smilla's Sense of Snow (1996)

The Rock (Original Motion Picture Score) is the film score to the 1996 film The Rock directed by Michael Bay starring Sean Connery, Nicolas Cage and Ed Harris. The film score is jointly composed and produced by Nick Glennie-Smith, Hans Zimmer and Harry Gregson-Williams. It was released through Hollywood Records on June 7, 1996, the same day as the film.

== Background ==
The score was mainly composed by Nick Glennie-Smith, while Hans Zimmer wrote the main themes and other additional pieces. Zimmer wanted to credit the entire score to Glennie-Smith having minimal influence in the project, while denying of any reports as a rescue job on a score started by another composer, calling it a collaborative effort. The score was recorded within four weeks. The Rock marked Zimmer's maiden collaboration with Bay, who would later on compose for most of Bay's films. Harry Gregson-Williams would serve as the producer, with Don Harper and Steven M. Stern providing additional music. Zimmer used instruments from Euphonix, Steinberg Cubase, Yamaha, Fairlight to create the score.

== Release ==
The Rock (Original Motion Picture Score) was released through Hollywood Records on June 7, 1996, as a CD and cassettes. The album contained eight tracks of selections from the score, running from one to fifteen minutes. A double CD expanded edition of the score was released through Intrada Records on October 3, 2023.

== Reception ==
Zanobard Reviews wrote "Nick Glennie-Smith, Hans Zimmer and Harry Gregson-Williams' The Rock is quite simply the gold standard for an action score, with multiple well-crafted main themes and many a phenomenal action setpiece thoroughly cementing this immense orchestral/electronic album as a genuine '90s classic." James Southall of Movie Wave wrote "It's a rather silly but not unrewarding score for a rather silly but not unrewarding film, and it changed everything."

Christian Clemmensen of Filmtracks wrote "The Rock is a decent score, and is great fun in parts when heard in the film, but Zimmer and the others are capable of far better." Jason Ankeny of AllMusic wrote "Too many cooks spoil the broth here—with so many contrasting compositional approaches in the mix, the music is a disjointed mess, and thematic unity is nothing more than an afterthought." Todd McCarthy of Variety considered the score "synthesizer-dominated".

== Track listing ==
=== Standard edition ===
No.	Title	Length
1.	"Hummell Gets the Rockets"	6:25
2.	"Rock House Jail"	10:12
3.	"Jade"	2:01
4.	"In the Tunnels"	8:40
5.	"Mason's Walk – First Launch"	9:34
6.	"Rocket Away"	14:25
7.	"Fort Walton – Kansas"	1:37
8.	"The Chase"	7:35
Total length:		60:29

=== Expanded edition ===
Disc 1
No.	Title	Length
1.	"Opening – Naval Weapons Depot"	8:07
2.	"Baby Gas"	2:28
3.	"Romance I–Tour's Over Bob"	3:46
4.	"Hummel Speech/Alcatraz Reopened"	2:25
5.	"Hummel's Demands To Pentagon"	1:21
6.	"Possible Romantic Cue"	0:46
7.	"Mason Montage"	1:26
8.	"San Francisco Montage"	1:17
9.	"Interrogation–Quarter"	1:28
10.	"Window Crash/Fairmont"	2:07
11.	"Haircut/Escape: The Chase!!"	8:21
12.	"Goodspeed Tracks Jade"	0:50
13.	"Jade"	1:58
14.	"Blueprints"	1:05
15.	"Hummel/SEALs"	7:14
16.	"Mason into Furnace/SEALs Tunnel–SEAL Attack"	9:24
17.	"Aftermath"	0:51
18.	"Bombs"	3:43
19.	"The Morgue"	1:45
20.	"Indiana Jones/Fight with Marines"	6:17
Total length:		66:39

Disc 2
No.	Title	Length
1.	"Hostage/Goodspeed Captured"	5:35
2.	"Plasma Bomb Is Ready"	0:52
3.	"Hammer Head"	6:02
4.	"President's Lament"	1:59
5.	"Mission's Over/Final Attack/Finale"	16:19
6.	"Fort Walton, Kansas"	1:39
7.	"End Titles – Hummel / SEALs"	2:14
8.	"SEAL Attack" (Alternate Segment)	1:34
9.	"Fort Walton, Kansas" (Alternate)	1:37
10.	"Main Theme Idea" (Nick's Demo Sketch)	2:36
11.	"Hummel Speech–Alcatraz Reopened" (Demo Version)	2:24
12.	"Haircut / Escape: The Chase!!" (Demo Version 1)	3:37
13.	"Haircut / Escape: The Chase!!" (Demo Version 2)	8:04
14.	"Haircut / Escape: The Chase!!" (Demo Version 3)	8:16
15.	"Naval Weapons Depot" (Rock Mix)	4:17
Total length:		67:05

== Personnel ==
Credits adapted from liner notes:

- Music composer – Nick Glennie-Smith, Hans Zimmer, Harry Gregson-Williams
- Music producer – Nick Glennie-Smith, Hans Zimmer, Harry Gregson-Williams
- Additional music – Don Harper, Steven M. Stern
- Music compiler – Marc Streitenfeld, Nick Glennie-Smith
- Guitar – Bob Daspit, Michael Stevens, Michael Thompson
- Conductor – Bruce Fowler, Don Harper, Nick Glennie-Smith
- Orchestrators – Bruce Fowler, Dennis Dreith, Ladd McIntosh, Suzette Moriarty, Walter Fowler
- Contractor – Sandy De Crescent
- Engineer – Marc Streitenfeld
- Recording – Alan Meyerson, Bruce Botnick, Paul Wertheimer
- Recordist – Paul Wertheimer, Brian Richards, Gregg W. Silk
- Mixing – Alan Meyerson
- Music editor – Bob Badami, John Finklea
- Assistant music editor – Shannon Erbe, Sienna Pascarella
- Score wrangler – Emma Burnham
- Executive producer – Jerry Bruckheimer
- Music preparation – Dominic Fidelibus
- Musical assistance – Justin Burnett, Marc Streitenfeld
- Executive in charge of music for the Walt Disney Motion Pictures Group – Kathy Nelson, Bill Green
- Executive in charge of soundtracks for Hollywood Records – Mitchell Leib

== Accolades ==
Award	Category	Recipient(s) and nominee(s)	Result	Ref.
International Film Music Critics Association	Best New Archival Release of an Existing Score – Re-Release or Re-Recording	Nick Glennie-Smith, Hans Zimmer and Harry Gregson-Williams (music), Stéphane Humez (album producer), Kaya Savas (liner notes) and Kay Marshall (album art direction)	Nominated	
Saturn Awards	Best Music	Nick Glennie-Smith, Hans Zimmer and Harry Gregson-Williams	Nominated	
