= Loss free resistor =

A loss free resistor (LFR) is a resistor that does not lose energy. The first implementation was due to Singer and it has been implemented in various settings.

== Overview ==
Many power processing systems can be improved by the application of resistive elements. Resistors may be applied for waveshaping, damping of oscillatory waveforms, stabilization of nonstable systems, and power flow balancing. The losses involved by the application of conventional resistors may be eliminated by the synthesis of artificial, loss-free resistive elements which replace the conventional ones. The conventional resistor converts the electrical energy absorbed at its terminals into heat; however, it has been found that creation of a resistive characteristic is not necessarily followed by such energy conversion. It is possible to synthesize a Loss-Free Resistor (LFR) by the combination of a switched mode converter and a suitable control circuit. The LFR is a two-port element that has a resistive i-v curve at the input terminals. The power absorbed at the input is transferred to the source that powers the total system, so in principle no losses occur.

== Basic LFR realization ==
The LFR realization is based on the control of a two-port element that has a time-variable transformer (TVT) or gyrator matrix. The realization of the controlled, time-variable transformer can be achieved by switched-mode circuits. Realization of a controlled gyrator can be obtained by the same types of circuits operated at current mode control. The input/output parameters of the TVT are given as follows:

$$\mathbf{x}^{(0)}=\begin{bmatrix}
v_i(t) \\
i_i(t) \\
\end{bmatrix}
=\begin{bmatrix}
k(t) & 0\\
0 & k^{-1}(t)\\
\end{bmatrix}
\begin{bmatrix}
v_0(t) \\
-i_0(t) \\
\end{bmatrix}$$

where k is the voltage transfer ratio of the TVT. In this case, the required resistive characteristic is created at the input terminal (a-b) of the TVT. The output of the TVT is connected to the source U, which powers the total circuit. The voltage at the input is given by $v_i = k(r)U = v_{ab}(t)$

A conventional linear resistor R connected to the terminals (a-b) implies the following voltage/current relation:

$v_{ab}(t)=i_{ab}(t)R$

So, by controlling the voltage transfer ratio of the switching converter (which realizes the TVT) such that the above equation is obeyed, a resistive characteristic is determined at terminals (a-b). In this case, the voltage transfer ratio k(r) is given by

$k(t)=\frac{i_{ab}(t)R}{U}$

where R is the resistive value of the synthesized LFR. In the case of realization by a controlled gyrator, the input/output parameters are given by

$$\mathbf{x}^{(0)}=\begin{bmatrix}
V_i \\
i_i \\
\end{bmatrix}
=\begin{bmatrix}
0 & g^{-1}(t)\\
g(t) & 0\\
\end{bmatrix}
\begin{bmatrix}
V_0(t) \\
-i_0(t) \\
\end{bmatrix}$$

where g is the gyration conductance. The resistive characteristic is obtained by controlling the gyration conductance such that the following equation is obeyed:

$g(t)=\frac{v_{ab}(t)}{UR}$

By applying a switched-mode converter composed of loss-free elements (in principle only), the power absorbed at terminals (a-b) is transferred to the source U, so in principle the losses are eliminated.

The LFR is materialized by the combination of a controlled TVT or TVG and a signal-processing circuit (SPC), which controls the coupling network, such that equations above are obeyed. Methods of loss reduction by the transferring of energy to the source that powers the circuit are well known; however, these methods are usually applied for recovering the energy trapped in storage elements. In those circuits, there is not continuous control of the coupling networks that transfer the recovered energy to the source. In our method, the required resistive characteristic is obtained by the continuous control of the loss-free, storage-less two ports.

== Properties of LFR ==
The LFR is a two-port element that has the following characteristics:

1. an equivalent resistive characteristic R at the input terminals, and
2. a power source P at the output terminals.

The value of P is determined by the power consumed by the equivalent resistor R. This power is supplied (by the power source P) to the bus U that powers the total system. The TVT (and TVG) can be realized by a family of switched-mode circuits. The losses, which practically occur in these circuits, can be modeled by a series and parallel resistors (r, and rp, respectively). Thus, the total circuit can be modeled by a cascade combination of those resistors and TVT (or TVG).
