= Inductive amplifier =

Test instrument type in electric industries

In electric industries, an inductive amplifier is a type of test instrument that does not require DC electrical contact to detect an AC wire under voltage.

The conventional use of the inductive amplifier is the location of breaks in hidden wires, even buried in concrete. The typical wire detection range in a concrete wall is 10–20 cm.

Inductive amplifiers can also be used to find an individual cable pair in a telephone cross connect or cable head when used in conjunction with a tone generator.

== See also ==
- Test light
