= Wavetek =

Electronic test equipment manufacturer

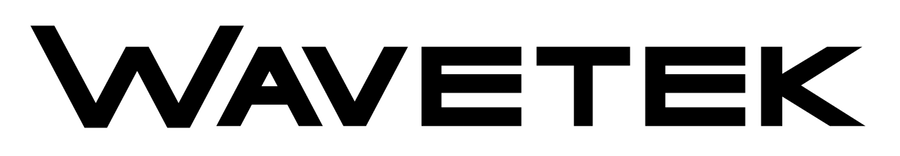
- Industry: Test & Measurement
- Founded: 1963
- Successor: Wavetek, Wandel & Goltermann
- Headquarters: San Diego, California
- Website: www.wavetek.com

Wavetek was an electronic test equipment manufacturer that made function generators, signal generators and service monitors. Although Wavetek did not invent the function generator, it made them commercially popular. The company faced a decline starting in the late 1970s, which eventually resulted in their sale to Torrey Investments in 1991. Since then, they have continued to produce low-cost digital instrumentation.

== History ==
Before Terrence Gooding, president and CEO of Wavetek, took Wavetek private in 1991, the company had 800 employees, 260 of whom worked in San Diego. The company had plants in the US states California, Florida, Indiana, and New York. It had overseas locations in Germany, Hong Kong and the United Kingdom.

In 1998, Wandel & Goltermann purchased Wavetek, and changed its name to Wavetek, Wandel & Goltermann (WWG).

In January 2000, test equipment manufacturer Fluke Corporation acquired Wavetek's Precision Management Division, and announced their intention to keep the Wavetek name for existing products. WWG kept Wavetek's LAN business unit, cable networks, fiber optics and wireless test gear.

== Merging ==
In February 2000, WWG merged with hand-held test equipment developer TTC.

In 2001, Wavetek's LAN tester division which developed the LanTEK series Ethernet test instruments was acquired by IDEAL Industries.

== Acquisition ==
On August 3, 2005, optical communications company JDSU acquired Acterna for $760 million, which became part of JDSU's Test and Measurement Group.
