= AN/URM-25 signal generator =

AN/URM-25
- URM-25D signal generator c. 1955
- Uses: Aligning radio equipment
- Manufacturer: Various, commissioned by U.S. military
- Model: 25D

The AN/URM-25 signal generator was an electronic vacuum-tube radio-frequency (RF) signal generator used during the 1950s and 1960s by the U.S. Military to test electronic equipment.

In accordance with the Joint Electronics Type Designation System (JETDS), the "AN/URM-25" designation represents the 25th design of an Army-Navy electronic device for general utility radio maintenance system. The JETDS system also now is used to name all Department of Defense electronic systems.

== History ==
The AN/URM-25 was part of a series of vacuum tube-based signal generators built for the U.S. military in the early Cold War-era.

Today they are collected and used by vintage amateur radio and antique radio enthusiasts who say they provide reasonably high accuracy and stability for a low cost, with build quality reflecting tough military construction requirements and standards.

== Specifications ==
w/freq. meter

Frequency output ranges from 10 kHz to 50 MHz with amplitude modulation selectable at 400 and 1,000 Hz. RF level from 0.1 microvolts to 100 millivolts or 2 volts is available depending upon termination load. Output impedance is 50,500 ohms.

Carrier signal generation is performed by a 6AH6 tube with an additional 6AH6 buffer stage followed by a 6AG7 output amplifier. Amplitude modulation at 400 and 1,000 Hz is provided by a 5814A (military 12AU7) oscillator. URM-25x models also contain an internal VTVM (vacuum tube voltmeter) and crystal calibration.

The carrier frequency can be set by interpolation using the graduated dial. Additionally, the URM-25's have a BNC connector for constant 200 mV output that can be connected to a frequency meter to display frequency accurately. A sufficient warm-up period is required to ensure the best stability at higher frequencies.

The cabinet cover includes accessories such as an impedance adapter, fixed attenuator and antenna simulator. Additional accessory kit MK-288 includes adapters and more dummy loads.

== Models and differences ==
The URM-25 units were released in several series from 25A through 25J; some differ substantially in both circuitry and configuration. It is common to find units having differing identification tags; i.e. front face tag may differ from the cabinet tag. Additionally, some units have additional minor circuitry that do not show up on the schematic.

== Overhauling ==
Some present-day electronic hobbyists say the URM-25 series is a good cost-effective choice to use for tuning radio equipment; but overhauling can be tricky and time-consuming. Many say that the model F is easier to work on than the model D, which is in relatively plentiful supply.

== See also ==
- List of military electronics of the United States
