= Stanford Research Systems =

- Headquarters: Sunnyvale, CA, USA
- Area served: Worldwide
- Products: Analog PID controllers Programmable temperature controllers Lock-in amplifiers Laser-diode controllers Low-noise preamplifiers High-voltage power supplies Gated integrators and boxcar averagers Synthesized function and clock generators Digital delay and pulse generators Frequency counters FFT spectrum analyzers LCR meters Thermocouple monitors Programmable filters Compact rubidium (atomic) frequency standards
- Website: www.thinksrs.com

Stanford Research Systems is a maker of general test and measurement instruments. The company was founded in 1980, is privately held, and is not affiliated with Stanford University.

Stanford Research Systems (SRS) manufactures all of their products at their Sunnyvale, California facility. SRS produces scientific and engineering instruments for a number of different fields. Many of the products fall under the general category of "signal recovery". These products are primarily sold to industry, university, and government labs, or sold as OEM components to other manufacturers.

== Electronic Products ==
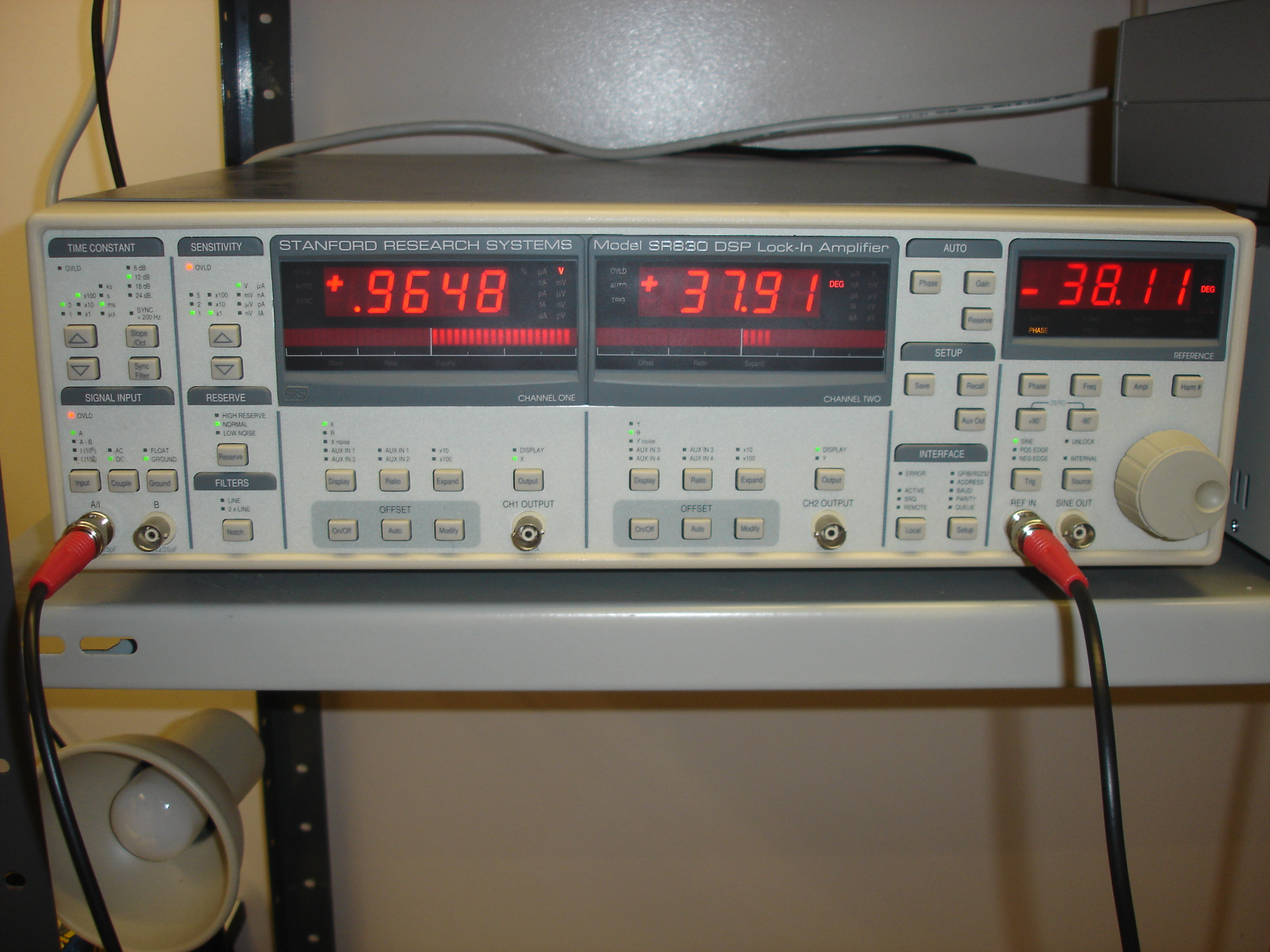
A lock-in amplifier from Stanford Research Systems

- Analog PID controllers
- Audio analyzers
- Programmable temperature controllers
- Lock-in amplifiers
- Laser-diode controllers
- Low-noise preamplifiers
- High-voltage power supplies
- Gated integrators and boxcar averagers
- Synthesized function and clock generators
- Digital delay and pulse generators
- Frequency counters
- FFT spectrum analyzers
- LCR meters
- Thermocouple monitors
- Programmable filters
- Compact rubidium (atomic) frequency standards

== Other Products ==
- Quartz crystal microbalances
- Melting-point apparatus
- Nitrogen laser
- Optical chopper
- Low-vibration optical shutters
- Vacuum gauges and controllers
- Residual gas analyzers (quadrupole mass spectrometers) and controllers
- Cryogenic temperature-measurement instrumentation
