= Radionuclide identification device =

A radionuclide identification device (RID or RIID) is a small, lightweight, portable gamma-ray spectrometer used for the detection and identification of radioactive substances. As RIIDs are portable, they are suitable for medical and industrial applications, fieldwork, geological surveys, first-line responders in Homeland Security, and Environmental Monitoring and Radiological Mapping along with other industries that necessitate the identification of radioactive substances..

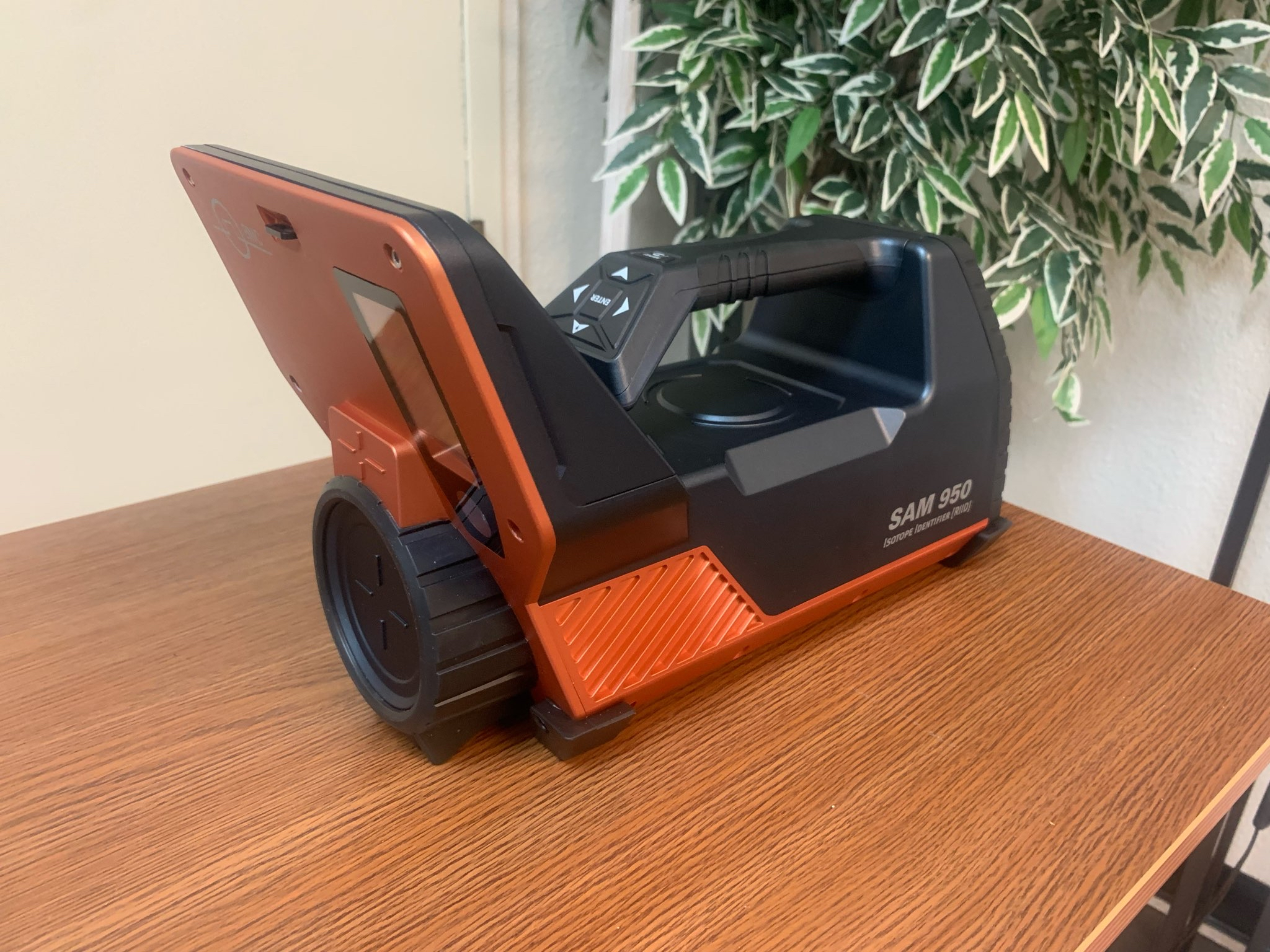
A Berkeley Nucleonics SAM 950 radiation isotope identification device

== ANSI requirements ==
RIIDs are designed to meet the requirements set out in IEEE/ANSI N42.34. These standards include water and shock resistance, large gamma energy range, detection of gamma and neutron sources, automatic system calibration, and temperature stabilization. These instruments are equipped with a specific ANSI library that contains a list of standard isotopes. Furthermore, most RIIDs have both a medical and an industrial library. Custom libraries may be included to cater to specific applications required by certain users.

== Detectors ==
Most RIIDs use scintillation detectors of various types and sizes. The most common type of detector is sodium iodide activated with thallium. Other detector types with improved resolution, low background, and thermal neutron detection are readily available. The relative efficiency of germanium detectors (including other types of detectors) are frequently compared to a standard 3 × 3 sodium iodide detector, representing 100% relative efficiency. Various measurements have shown that cerium bromide (CeBr_{3}) has improved efficiency and resolution compared to sodium iodide, with comparably low background radiation.

== History ==
The discovery of the neutron by James Chadwick in 1932 helped to establish the essential nature of the atomic nucleus. Detection of the neutron requires a special environment because neutrons do not typically cause ionization, since they are not charged particles. However, if the interaction of the neutron is with a nuclide of high neutron cross-section, then a response to neutrons becomes probable. Nuclides commonly used as neutron detector materials are helium-3, lithium-6, boron-10 and uranium-235. The detector material is surrounded by a moderator which reduces the kinetic energy of the neutron (slowing down the neutron). Moderated neutrons are commonly called thermal neutrons, and they provide a high probability of interaction with the target material.

The following neutron detectors are among the most common types used today:

=== Helium-3 gas-filled proportional detectors ===
^{3}He was first proposed as a neutron detector in 1939. It was first thought to be a radioactive isotope until samples of natural helium were found (which is mostly helium-4). Helium is found just below the Earth's crust in a ratio of 300 atoms of ^{3}He per million atoms of ^{4}He.

With no electrical charge, neutron interaction with atomic electrons is not possible (as in X-ray, gamma, electron or beta detectors). Therefore, we rely on interaction with an atomic nucleus.

The n + ^{3} He reaction is shown below with conservation of energy as:

n + ^{3}He → ^{3}H + p + 764 keV

The energy of 764 keV is the sum of the proton kinetic energy of 573 keV plus the triton (tritium ion) kinetic energy of 191 keV. This energy (charge) is collected as daughter products, yielding an output pulse that is proportional to the 764 keV energy for thermal neutrons. ^{3}He provides an efficient neutron detector when it reacts by absorbing thermal neutrons, producing a ^{1}H proton and a ^{3}H ion (tritium). Its sensitivity to gamma rays is negligible, providing a very useful neutron detector. Unfortunately, the supply of ^{3}He is limited to production as a byproduct from the decay of tritium (which has a 12.3-year half-life). Tritium is produced either as part of weapons programs as a booster for nuclear weapons or as a byproduct of reactor operation. Therefore, the price of these detectors is somewhat high due to limited availability.

=== Lithium-6 neutron detectors ===
Scintillating ^{6}Li glass for neutron detection was first reported in 1957. However, it was not until the early 1990s that major advances were made by Pacific Northwest National Laboratory. These new techniques were first classified and later declassified in 1994.

The scintillating glass fibers operate by combining ^{6}Li and Cerium ions into the glass composition. Since ^{6}Li has a high cross-section for thermal neutron absorption, this reaction will produce a tritium ion, an alpha particle, and kinetic energy. The ionization produced is transferred to the cerium ions which results in an emission of photons with wavelength 390 to 600 nm. This event results in a flash of light of several thousand photons for each neutron absorbed. The glass fiber acts as a waveguide for the scintillation light which is coupled to a PMT. Pulse shape discrimination (PSD) is then used to separate gamma and neutron events.

A similar reaction with ^{6}Li is used for neutron detection in CLYC detectors. The CLYC crystal uses 95% enriched ^{6}Li and is doped with cerium ions. This detector produces monoenergetic pulses above 3 MeV for thermal neutrons. This gamma/neutron separation is further enhanced by PSD and algorithm improvements. Other detectors like CLLBC are available and offer good gamma resolution and neutron separation up to gamma fields of 20 mR/h and higher. Some detectors offer fast timing (~60 ns) so that a large dynamic range in counting rates is possible.

== Isotope identification ==
Gamma rays were first discovered and studied in 1900 by a French chemist, Paul Villard while observing radiation from radium. However, the first quantitative analysis of gamma radiation is credited to Rutherford and Andrade in 1914. This earliest technique was accomplished by diffraction spectroscopy using a rock-salt crystal.

Crystal diffraction is regarded as an important and pioneering effort in the analysis of gamma-ray energy but falls short of a means to accurately quantify and identify various radionuclides. Gamma spectroscopy did not come around for several more decades.

=== Gamma-ray spectroscopy ===
A spectrometer system for radionuclide analysis is composed of a photon detector and associated electronics (e.g., amplifier and pulse shaping) including a means of sorting various energy events and recording/displaying the data. These events are sorted to produce a spectrum (histogram) displaying the intensity (of events) as a function of photon energy.

The advent of the sodium-iodide scintillator in 1948 and other detectors to follow became useful for spectroscopy. The photon detector and the Multichannel Pulse-Height Analyzer (MCA) become the primary tools needed to produce a pulse-height spectrum of one or more radionuclides. It is first necessary to derive a digital number that is proportional to the amplitude of the analog pulse. This is performed in an Analog-to-Digital Converter (ADC) which is a key part of the MCA. Several linear and fast ADCs have been developed over the years (e.g., Wilkinson). One of the first MCAs was developed by Fred Goulding in the 1950s, at the Atomic Energy of Canada, Chalk River facility. This MCA was called a “Kicksorter” and boasted excellent linearity and 100 channels. Goulding later worked at the Lawrence Berkeley Lab (1959) and brought some of the early nuclear counting technology to Berkeley and Livermore Labs. Through later years several advances in MCAs have been impressive with 16K channel analyzers being common. Improvements in nuclear detectors have brought improved energy resolution creating advancements in nuclear science. In the early 1960s germanium (Ge) detectors were being developed with excellent energy resolution. This work has continued with an emphasis on high purity and larger ingots. Since these detectors are cooled to liquid nitrogen temperatures advancements in room temperature detectors have been necessary for small, portable instruments called Radioisotope Identification Devices (RIIDs). Newer high-resolution scintillators have improved the functionality of RIIDs as tools for Homeland Security and many other applications requiring the spectroscopic identification of radioisotopes.

== Additional features ==
Some RIIDs have additional features not required by ANSI, such as external probes for verification of Special Nuclear Material (SNM). One example is an external Pancake probe used in the detection of alpha and beta radiation.
