= Arbitrary waveform generator =

Electronic test equipment

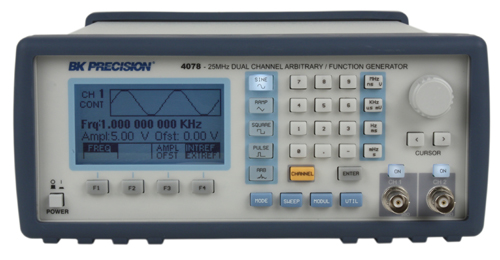
The BK Precision model 4078 Dual Channel Arbitrary Waveform Generator uses direct digital synthesis to generate waveforms up to 400,000 points

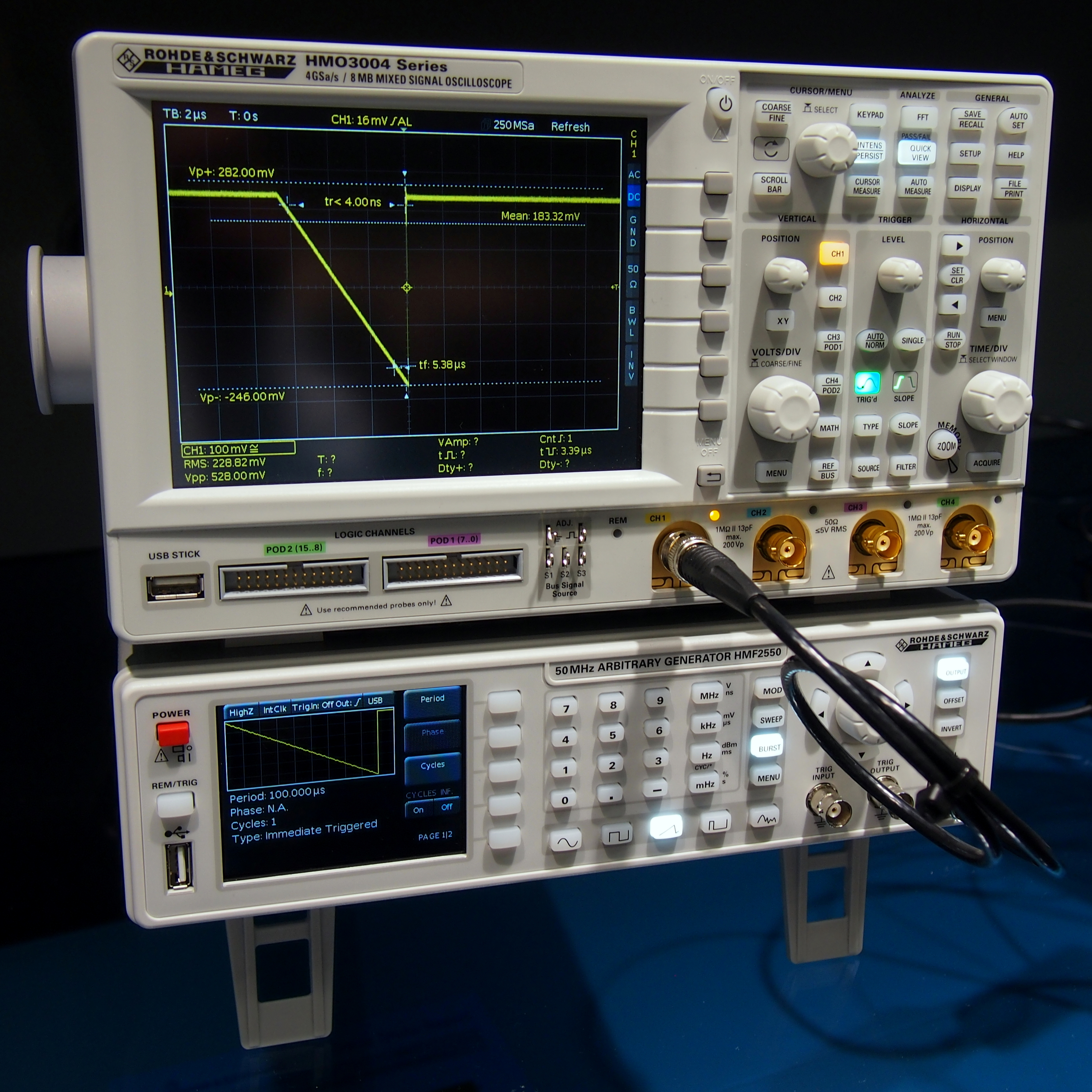
HAMEG HMF 2550 digital AWG under an oscilloscope displaying the generated waveform

An arbitrary waveform generator (AWG) is a piece of electronic test equipment used to generate electrical waveforms. These waveforms can be either repetitive or single-shot (once only) in which case some kind of triggering source is required (internal or external). The resulting waveforms can be injected into a device under test and analyzed as they progress through it, confirming the proper operation of the device or pinpointing a fault in it.

== Operation ==
Unlike function generators, AWGs can generate any arbitrarily defined waveshape as their output. The waveform is usually defined as a series of "waypoints" (specific voltage targets occurring at specific times along the waveform) and the AWG can either jump to those levels or use any of several methods to interpolate between those levels.

For example, a 50% duty cycle square wave is easily obtained by defining just two points: At t_{0}, set the output voltage to 100% and at t_{50%}, set the output voltage back to 0. Set the AWG to jump (not interpolate) between these values and the result is the desired square wave. By comparison, a triangle wave could be produced from the same data simply by setting the AWG to linearly interpolate between these two points.

Because AWGs synthesize the waveforms using digital signal processing techniques, their maximum frequency is usually limited to no more than a few gigahertz. The output connector from the device is usually a BNC connector and requires a 50 or 75 ohm termination.

== Features ==
AWGs, like most signal generators, may also contain an attenuator, various means of modulating the output waveform, and often contain the ability to automatically and repetitively "sweep" the frequency of the output waveform (by means of a voltage-controlled oscillator) between two operator-determined limits. This capability makes it very easy to evaluate the frequency response of a given electronic circuit.

Some AWGs also operate as conventional function generators. These can include standard waveforms such as sine, square, ramp, triangle, noise and pulse. Some units include additional built-in waveforms such as exponential rise and fall times, sinx/x, and cardiac. Some AWGs allow users to retrieve waveforms from a number of digital and mixed-signal oscilloscopes. Some AWG's may display a graph of the waveform on their screen - a graph mode. Some AWGs have the ability to output a pattern of words on a multiple-bit connector to simulate data transmission, combining the properties of both AWGs and digital pattern generators.

One feature of DDS-based arbitrary waveform generators is that their digital nature allows multiple channels to be operated with precisely controlled phase offsets or ratio-related frequencies. This allows the generation of polyphase sine waves, I-Q constellations, or simulation of signals from geared mechanical systems such as jet engines. Complex channel-channel modulations are also possible.

Some AWG models include various detection schemes to adjust output waveforms in real time based on different kind of measurement results obtained for instance by signal demodulation, photon counting or triggering with an oscilloscope. The integration for signal generation and detection helps to minimize feedback times for demanding applications as for example in certain implementations of quantum error correction and quantum teleportation.

== See also ==
- Digital Pattern Generator
