= Pulse generator =

Electronic circuit or test equipment

Pulses of width t_{1} with negligible rise and fall times, repeating at frequency 1/T

A pulse generator is a device that produces controlled bursts of energy characterized by attributes such as duration (commonly known as pulse width), rise and fall time, amplitude, and pulse repetition rate (frequency). They are implemented in various ways, including as elementary system components, laboratory and scientific instruments, and industrial equipment.

Pulse generators are used to create precise, repeatable pulses, which in turn are used to trigger responses in other equipment or stimulate external mediums. The generated pulses are typically electrical, optical, thermal, or mechanical in nature, though other manifestations are possible. Pulse generators are commonly used to provide stimulus in applications such as testing, control systems, communications, medical devices, and optical systems.

== Electric pulse generators ==
=== Elementary pulse generators ===
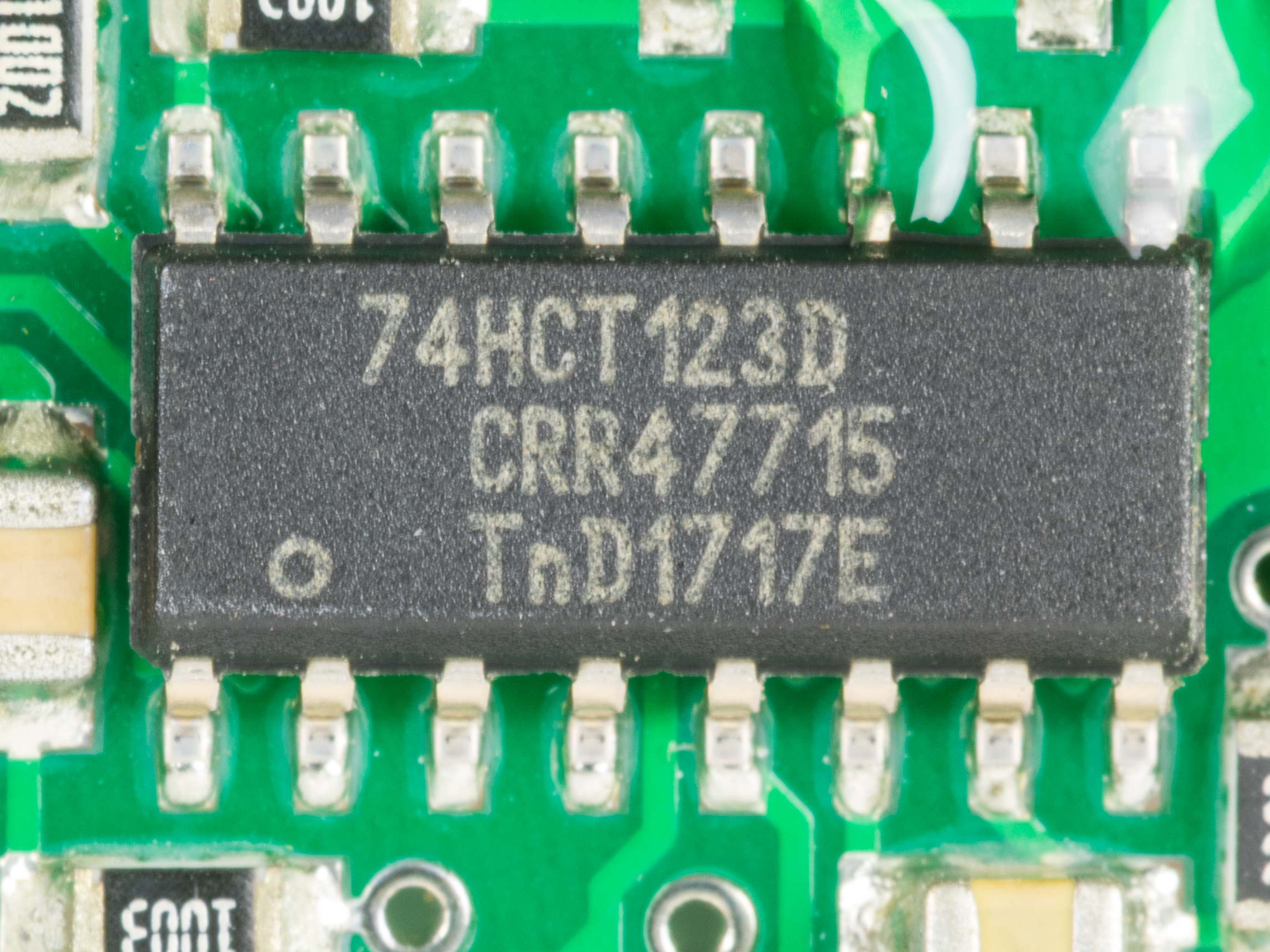
Dual monostable multivibrator (74HCT123D)

Elementary pulse generators are used in a wide variety of applications. Examples of these include digital one-shot timers and analog monostable multivibrators, which output a single pulse when triggered, and free-running pulse generators such as periodic interval timers and astable multivibrators.

=== Bench pulse generators ===
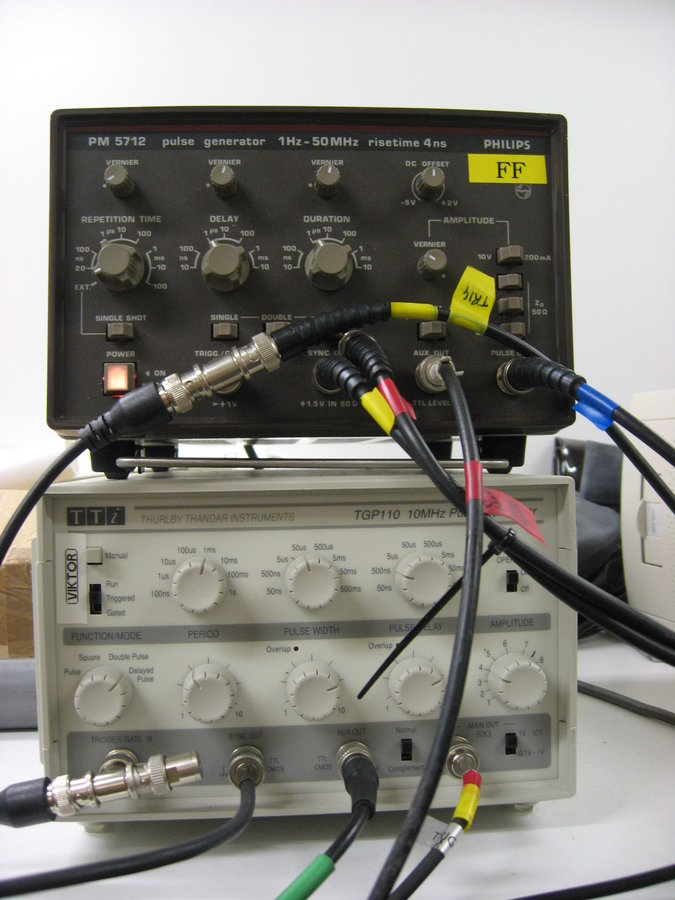
Bench pulse generators in a physics laboratory

Bench pulse generators usually allow control of the pulse repetition rate, pulse width, delay with respect to an internal or external trigger, and the high and low voltage levels of the pulses. More sophisticated pulse generators may allow control over the pulse rise time and fall time. Pulse generators are available for generating pulse widths ranging from minutes to under one picosecond. Bench pulse generators are typically voltage sources, though some can generate current pulses.

Pulse generators may use digital techniques, analog techniques, or both to form the output pulses. For example, the pulse repetition rate and duration may be digitally controlled but the pulse amplitude and rise and fall times may be determined by analog circuitry in the output stage of the pulse generator. With correct adjustment, pulse generators can also produce a 50% duty cycle square wave. Pulse generators are generally single-channel, providing one frequency, delay, width and output.

==== Multi-channel instruments ====
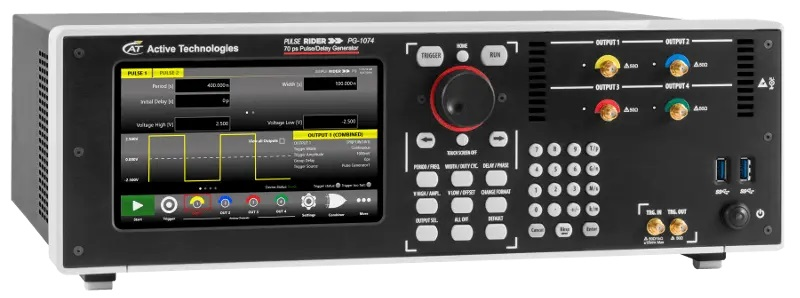
picosecond pulse generator

Some pulse generators have features such as multiple input triggers and multiple output channels with independent widths, delays, polarities, and repetition rates. Some can combine select channels onto one output to generate more complex signals. These digital delay generators are useful for synchronizing, delaying, gating and triggering external circuits, usually with respect to one event. Multiple input triggers facilitate synchronization of trigger and data acquisition events.

Generators for pulse widths over a few microseconds employ digital counters for pulse timing, whereas widths between approximately one nanosecond and several microseconds are typically generated by analog techniques such as RC (resistor-capacitor) networks or switched delay lines.

=== Microwave pulse generators ===
Pulse generators capable of pulse widths under approximately 100 picoseconds, often called microwave pulsers, typically generate pulses using step recovery diode (SRD) or Nonlinear Transmission Line (NLTL) methods. SRD pulse generators are inexpensive, but typically require several volts of input drive and have significant jitter (time variation between successive pulses). NLTL pulse generators generally have less jitter but cannot be integrated into low cost monolithic ICs. Another method, referred to as RACE (Rapid Automatic Cascode Exchange), has been demonstrated in monolithic IC form that produces pulses as short as one picosecond and repetition rates exceeding 30 billion pulses per second.

== Optical pulse generators ==
Optical pulse generators output light pulses, and allow control of attributes such as pulse repetition rate, delay from trigger input to light pulse output, pulse width, and light intensity. The light is typically produced by a LED or laser diode.

== Mechanical pulse generators ==
A falling weight deflectometer is a testing device used to evaluate pavement and railway tracks. In operation, it produces a mechanical load pulse by dropping a weight onto a pulse-shaping mechanism and transmitting the shaped pulse to the pavement through a load plate.

== Applications ==
Pulses can be injected into a device that is under test and used as a stimulus, clock signal, or analyzed as they progress through the device, confirming the proper operation of the device or pinpointing a fault in the device.

Pulse generators are used to drive devices such as switches, lasers and optical components, modulators, intensifiers, and resistive loads.

In frequency counters, pulse generators are used to control the measurement interval, known as the gate time.

The output of a pulse generator may be used as the modulation signal for a signal generator.

Non-electronic applications include those in material science, medical, physics, and chemistry. For example, pulse generators are used in pulsed-field gel electrophoresis to separate DNA molecules by size.
