= Waveform =

Shape and form of a signal

Sine, square, triangle, and sawtooth waveforms.

A sine, square, and sawtooth wave at 440 Hz

A composite waveform that is shaped like a teardrop.

A waveform generated by a synthesizer

In electronics, acoustics, and related fields, the waveform of a signal is the shape of its graph as a function of time, independent of its time and magnitude scales and of any displacement in time. Periodic waveforms repeat regularly at a constant period. The term can also be used for non-periodic or aperiodic signals, like chirps and pulses.

In electronics, the term is usually applied to time-varying voltages, currents, or electromagnetic fields. In acoustics, it is usually applied to steady periodic sounds — variations of pressure in air or other media. In these cases, the waveform is an attribute that is independent of the frequency, amplitude, or phase shift of the signal.

The waveform of an electrical signal can be visualized with an oscilloscope or any other device that can capture and plot its value at various times, with suitable scales in the time and value axes. The electrocardiograph is a medical device to record the waveform of the electric signals that are associated with the beating of the heart; that waveform has important diagnostic value. Waveform generators, which can output a periodic voltage or current with one of several waveforms, are a common tool in electronics laboratories and workshops.

The waveform of a steady periodic sound affects its timbre. Synthesizers and modern keyboards can generate sounds with many complex waveforms.

== Common periodic waveforms ==
Simple examples of periodic waveforms include the following, where $t$ is time, $\lambda$ is wavelength, $a$ is amplitude and $\phi$ is phase:

- Sine wave: $(t, \lambda, a, \phi) = a\sin \frac{2\pi t - \phi}{\lambda}.$ The amplitude of the waveform follows a trigonometric sine function with respect to time.
- Square wave:
  $$(t, \lambda, a, \phi) = \begin{cases}
a, (t-\phi) \bmod \lambda < \text{duty} \\
-a, \text{otherwise}
\end{cases}.$$
  This waveform is commonly used to represent digital information. A square wave of constant period contains odd harmonics that decrease at −6 dB/octave.
- Triangle wave: $(t, \lambda, a, \phi) = \frac{2a}{\pi} \arcsin \sin \frac{2\pi t - \phi}{\lambda}.$ It contains odd harmonics that decrease at −12 dB/octave.
- Sawtooth wave: $(t,\lambda, a, \phi) = \frac{2a}{\pi} \arctan \tan \frac{2\pi t - \phi}{2\lambda}.$ This looks like the teeth of a saw. Found often in time bases for display scanning. It is used as the starting point for subtractive synthesis, as a sawtooth wave of constant period contains odd and even harmonics that decrease at −6 dB/octave.

The Fourier series describes the decomposition of periodic waveforms, such that any periodic waveform can be formed by the sum of a (possibly infinite) set of fundamental and harmonic components. Finite-energy non-periodic waveforms can be analyzed into sinusoids by the Fourier transform.

Other periodic waveforms are often called composite waveforms and can often be described as a combination of a number of sinusoidal waves or other basis functions added together.

== See also ==
- Arbitrary waveform generator
- Carrier wave
- Crest factor
- Continuous waveform
- Envelope (music)
- Frequency domain
- Phase offset modulation
- Spectrum analyzer
- Waveform monitor
- Waveform viewer
- Wave packet
