= Prescaler =

Counting circuit component

A prescaler is an electronic counting circuit used to reduce a high frequency electrical signal to a lower frequency by integer division. The prescaler takes the basic timer clock frequency (which may be the CPU clock frequency or may be some higher or lower frequency) and divides it by some value before feeding it to the timer, according to how the prescaler register(s) are configured. The prescaler values, referred to as prescales, that may be configured might be limited to a few fixed values (powers of 2), or they may be any integer value from 1 to 2^P, where P is the number of prescaler bits.

The purpose of the prescaler is to allow the timer to be clocked at the rate a user desires. For shorter (8 and 16-bit) timers, there will often be a tradeoff between resolution (high resolution requires a high clock rate) and range (high clock rates cause the timer to overflow more quickly). For example, one cannot (without some tricks) achieve 1 μs resolution and a 1 sec maximum period using a 16-bit timer. In this example using 1 μs resolution would limit the period to about 65ms maximum. However the prescaler allows tweaking the ratio between resolution and maximum period to achieve a desired effect.

== Example of use ==
Prescalers are typically used at very high frequency to extend the upper frequency range of frequency counters, phase locked loop (PLL) synthesizers, and other counting circuits. When used in conjunction with a PLL, a prescaler introduces a normally undesired change in the relationship between the frequency step size and phase detector comparison frequency. For this reason, it is common to either restrict the integer to a low value, or use a dual-modulus prescaler in this application. A dual-modulus prescaler is one that has the ability to selectively divide the input frequency by one of two (normally consecutive) integers, such as 32 and 33. Common fixed-integer microwave prescalers are available in modulus 2, 4, 8, 5 and 10, and can operate at frequencies in excess of 10 GHz.

== Nomenclature ==
A prescaler is essentially a counter-divider, and thus the names may be used somewhat interchangeably.

== See also ==
- Frequency divider
