= Robert Royce Johnson =

American inventor, engineer, computer pioneer, and professor

Robert Royce Johnson (1928–2016) was an American inventor, engineer, computer pioneer, and professor. Besides the Johnson counter, a type of ring counter that was named for him, he developed the method of encoding numbers on checks still in use as of 2018.

== Education ==
Johnson earned a bachelor's degree in electrical engineering at University of Wisconsin and masters in servomechanisms at Yale. In 1956, Johnson was awarded the Ph.D. degree at Caltech, their first in digital computing.

== Career ==
While at Caltech, Johnson went to work for Hughes aircraft, where he developed digital guidance systems for aircraft and missiles. Leaving Caltech with a Ph.D., he joined the research laboratories of General Electric in Schenectady, New York, where he worked on the computerized banking system ERMA, including inventing the magnetic number shapes still in use on checks today. He then went to Burroughs Corp where he came vice president of engineering in 1964. From there, he worked at Energy Conversion Devices and Ovonic Imaging Systems before moving to head the computer science department at the University of Utah in 1987, from which he retired in 1993. After his academic retirement, he worked for Filoli Information Systems of Palo Alto, California, and SI Diamond of Austin, Texas.
