= Ali Hajimiri =

American engineer

- Education: Sharif University of Technology (B.S.); Stanford University (M.S., Ph.D.)
- Awards: Feynman Prize for Excellence in Teaching (2019); Microwave Prize (2015)
- Scientific career
- Fields: Electrical Engineering
- Workplaces: California Institute of Technology
- Doctoral advisor: Thomas H. Lee; Bruce A. Wooley
- Doctoral students: Donhee Ham; Ehsan Afshari

Ali Hajimiri (Persian: علی حاجی میری) is an Iranian-American academic, entrepreneur, and inventor in various fields of engineering, including electrical engineering and biomedical engineering. He is the Bren Professor of Electrical Engineering and Medical Engineering at the California Institute of Technology (Caltech).

== Education ==
Hajimiri received the B.S. degree in electrical engineering from Sharif University of Technology in Iran and his M.S. and Ph.D. degrees in electrical engineering from Stanford University. He has also worked for Bell Laboratories, Philips Semiconductors, and Sun Microsystems. As a part of his Ph.D. thesis, he developed a time-varying phase noise model for electrical oscillators, also known as the Hajimiri phase noise model.

== Career ==
In 2002, together with his former students Ichiro Aoki and Scott Kee, he cofounded Axiom Microdevices Inc. based on their invention of the Distributed Active Transformer (DAT), which made it possible to integrate RF CMOS power amplifiers suitable for cellular phones in CMOS technology. Axiom shipped hundreds of millions of units before it was acquired by Skyworks Solutions in 2009.

He and his students also demonstrated the world's first radar-on-a-chip in silicon technology in 2004, showing a 24-GHz 8-element phased array receiver and a 4-element phased array transmitter in CMOS. These were followed by a 77-GHz phased array transceiver (transmitter and receiver) with on chip antennas that established the highest level of integration in mm-wave frequency applications and was a complete radar-on-a-chip. They also developed a fully scalable phased array architecture in 2008, making it possible to realize very-large-scale phased arrays.

He and his team are also responsible for the development of an all-silicon THz imager system, where an integrated CMOS microchip was used in conjunction with a second silicon microchip to form an active THz imaging system, capable of seeing through opaque objects. They demonstrated various phased array transmitters around 0.3THz with beam steering using the distributed active radiator (DAR) architecture in 2011. Various applications of this system appear in security, communications, medical diagnostics, and the human-machine interface.

In 2013, he and some of his team members demonstrated a complete self-healing power amplifier, which through an integrated self-healing strategy, could recover from various kinds of degradation and damage including aging, local failure, and intentional laser blasts.

Between 2014 and 2018, his lab demonstrated several major advances in imaging, projection, and sensing technology on silicon photonic platforms. In 2014, they showed the first silicon nanophotonic optical phased array transmitter capable of dynamic and real-time image projection, therefore serving as a lensless projector. In 2015, he and his group constructed a 3D coherent camera via a silicon nanophotonic coherent imager (NCI) that performed direct 3D imaging at meter range with a 15-micron depth resolution. In 2016, they devised and implemented a one-dimensional (1D) integrated optical phased array receiver which could image a barcode directly from the surface of a chip, followed in 2017 by an integrated two-dimensional (2D) optical phased array receiver capable of imaging simple 2D patterns without a lens using a very thin optical synthetic aperture of a few microns, thereby demonstrating a lensless flat camera for the first time. In 2018, they demonstrated the world's first all-integrated optical gyroscope, whose principle of operation is based on the Sagnac effect.

In 2019, he and one of his students generalized the mathematical framework underlying his time-varying phase noise model to encompass the phenomenon of injection locking in electrical oscillators.

He and his team have also developed systems and technologies for wireless power transfer at a distance since 2012. In 2017, he co-founded GuRu Wireless (formerly Auspion, Inc.), which commercializes wireless power transfer technology for consumers. The technology has been used to demonstrate 96 hours of continuous untethered drone flight.

He and his team have also been working on Space-based solar power and wireless energy transfer in space since early 2010's. On March 3, 2023, he and his team demonstrated wireless power transmission in space for the first time using MAPLE (Microwave Array for Power-transfer Low-orbit Experiment) that was launched on January 2, 2023 on a SpaceX rocket from Cape Canaveral. The experiment used an array of microwave transmitters driven by custom CMOS integrated chips one a flexible substrate that operated as a focusing array and demonstrated selective wireless energy transfer to different receivers in orbit and also could point it beam of energy to earth which was received on earth at Caltech.

== Awards and recognitions ==
- 2019 Winner of the Richard P. Feynman Prize for Excellence in Teaching, Caltech's most prestigious teaching award.
- 2015 Winner, Microwave Prize.
- 2013 Recognized as a top-10 contributor to ISSCC in its 60-year history.
- 2004 Named to the world's top 35 innovators under 35 (TR35) at age 32.
- 2022, 2014, and 2006 Associated Students of the California Institute of Technology (ASCIT) teaching awards.
- 2004 Best Paper Award, IEEE Journal of Solid-State Circuits
- 2002 National Science Foundation CAREER Award
- 1998 Jack Kilby Best Paper Award, International Solid-State Circuits Conference
- 1990 Bronze Medal, International Physics Olympiad
- 1990 Gold Medal (Absolute Winner), National Physics Olympiad

== Fellowships and academy membership ==
- Fellow, National Academy of Inventors (NAI).
- Fellow, IEEE
- Served as distinguished lecturer of IEEE Solid-State Society and Microwave Society.

== Books ==
- Analog: Inexact Science, Vibrant Art, 2020
- The Design of Low Noise Oscillators, co-authored with Thomas H. Lee, Springer, 1999, ISBN 0-7923-8455-5
