= Louis Morin =

American chemist (1922–2003)

Louis George Morin (18 February 1922 – 3 May 2003) was an American chemist and inventor.

== Biography ==
Morin was born in Saint-Paul-de-Montminy, Quebec and immigrated to the United States as a child.

He began experimenting with the use of crystals in radio transmitter design while serving in the U.S. Army during the Second World War, and later operated several commercial electroplating facilities in Westchester County, New York.

In 1969, Morin produced the gold-plated mesh used on the Apollo Lunar Module’s erectable S-band antenna. He held numerous patents in the field of electrochemistry and developed a number of original methods for the electroplating of non-metallic filaments. In 1980, Morin used the latter methods to produce the dielectric composite in the stealth technology airframe of the B-2 Spirit.

Morin lived in Tarrytown, New York and spent the later years of his life working in experimental crystallography. He also recorded a series of audio lectures that were widely disseminated throughout the metal finishing industry.

He died of heart failure in the Bronx, New York.
