= Remote Activation Munition System =

The Remote Activation Munition System (RAMS) is a radio frequency controlled system that is used to remotely detonate demolition charges. It can also be used to remotely operate electronic equipment such as beacons, laser markers, and radios.

RAMS was developed by a team of researchers led by James Chopak at the Army Research Laboratory from 1996 to 2000. The system consists of a transmitter and two different types of receivers, one to initiate blasting caps and one to initiate C4 directly.

RAMS was designed to serve as a more portable and convenient alternative to conventional remote activation systems like the model XM-122, which was considered too big, heavy, and fragile for efficient use. In addition, the XM-122 was limited in its range (about 1 km) and relied on very large high capacity batteries.

In contrast, the RAMS weighed only a couple pounds and its microprocessor-based transmitter was powered by seven standard 9-volt batteries. The device was capable of reaching a range up to 2 kilometers, and the combination of the crystal filter in the receivers and the FM detector circuit made it possible to maintain high signal sensitivity at a low power consumption rate.

In addition, the RAMS was operational in harsh environments with temperatures as low as −25 °F (−32 °C) and as high as 140 °F (60 °C). It was also capable of functioning when submerged in saltwater, up to depths of 66 feet (20 m). However, testing performed by the Army Research Laboratory have found that due to the low power levels of the RAMS receiver’s electrical signals output, the system has demonstrated a noticeable level of unreliability in performance past a certain distance.

More modern versions of the RAMS can weigh as little as 3 pounds (1.4 kg) and can reach a range of more than 5 kilometers, allowing operators to stand further away from the blast at a safer distance.
