= Integrated optical phased array =

Chip-based solid-state devices that can steer, shape, or focus beams of light

Integrated optical phased arrays (OPAs) are chip-based solid-state devices that can steer, shape, or focus beams of light. They typically work by splitting the beam into an array of nanoscale emitters and controlling the phase of each individual emitter. The individual emitted waves then combine and interfere to steer the resulting beam at the intended angle.

The two main components every integrated OPA has are the splitter network and phase modulators. The splitter network splits the input laser into however many channels are required. This is usually done using multimode interference couplers, directional couplers, or star couplers. Then, the phase of each individual channel is shifted. This is usually done using thermo-optic effect or electro-optic effects. The waves are then ejected into free space, where they interfere to steer the resulting beam.

== Types ==
A 1D integrated OPA is the most basic of integrated OPAs. An angle is generated along the single dimension by altering the phase. Depending on the layout of the component, each channel may also contain a grating emitter, which scatters the light wave into a beam directed out from the surface of the chip, dependent on wavelength. However, 1D integrated OPAs use a fixed wavelength, so the angle of diffraction is also fixed. The channels may also just be ejected out the polished end of the silicon platform, called an end-fire emitter.

There are also 1D integrated OPAs with pseudo-2D capabilities, utilizing a variable wavelength wave emitter. These are often dubbed "1.5D" integrated OPAs. This framework includes a grating emitter at each channel. After each channel's phase is shifted, it's directed to a grating emitter. The emitter then scatters the wave into a directed beam whose angle is dependent on wavelength, which can be controlled by the wave source. Then, the different phases of the channels interfere to steer the resulting beam in the specified angle perpendicular to the angle generated by the gratings. The core difference being a 1D OPA uses a fixed wavelength, and this version utilizes a variable wavelength to achieve a second dimension of freedom.

2D integrated OPA is very similar to its 1D counterpart, but implements a two dimensional array of channels, as its name suggests. In a true 2D OPA, a fixed wavelength input beam is split into N*N channels. Each channel's phase is shifted and emitted in a grid of N by N channels. This allows the resulting beam to be steered in two directions. Alternatively, 2N channels can be used, requiring only 2N phase shifters. For every pixel on the matrix, some of each channel in the first and second dimension are split off and combined with a Y-junction. This sums the phase shift, and the resulting wave is emitted into free space like a true 2D OPA. However, currently, the degrees of freedom using this method are much less than that of a true 2D OPA.

== Applications ==
Integrated OPAs find application in many technologies, including, but not limited to:

- Light Detection and Ranging (LiDAR): Integrated OPAs replace mechanical parts typically used in LiDAR systems with small, solid-state devices.
- Free-Space Optical Communication (FSOC): Integrated OPAs can be used for communication between a multitude of devices. Ground-to-satellite, line-of-sight, chip-to-chip, or datacenter optical interconnects, among others.
- Biomedical Sensing and Imaging: Integrated OPAs find use in lens-less light-sheet microscopy and optical tweezers in optogenetics.
- Specialized Beam Generation and Holography: On top of steering, integrated OPAs can dynamically adjust the focal length of a beam by applying a quadratic shift in the channels rather than a linear shift. This can be used in nanofabrication, advanced displays, and projection. This can be used for advanced augmented reality (AR) displays.
