= Roofing filter =

A roofing filter is a type of filter used in a HF radio receiver that limits the passband in the early stages of the receiver electronics. It blocks strong signals outside the receive channel which can overload following amplifier and mixer stages.

== Purpose ==
The roofing filter is usually found after the first receiver mixer (which normally contains an amplifier) to limit the first intermediate frequency (IF) stage's passband. It prevents overloading later amplifier stages, which would cause nonlinearity ("distortion") or clipping ("buzz") even if the overload occurred on frequencies whose signal is not heard directly.

Roofing filters are usually crystal or ceramic filter types, with a passband for general purpose shortwave radio reception of about 6–20 kHz (for AM–NFM). The receiver's bandwidth is not determined by the roofing filter passband, but instead by a follow-on crystal filter, mechanical filter, or DSP filter, all of which allow a much tighter filtering curve than a typical roofing filter.

For more demanding uses like listening to weak CW or SSB signals, a roofing filter is required that gives a smaller passband appropriate to the mode of the received signal. It is often used at a high first IF stage above 40 MHz, with passband widths of 250 Hz, 500 Hz (for CW), or 1.8 kHz (for SSB). These narrow filters require that the receiver uses a first IF well below VHF range, perhaps 9 or 11 MHz.

== See also ==
- Bandpass filter – category that includes roofing filters
- Preselector – an external device that serves a similar function
