= Magneto Inductive Remote Activation Munition System =

The Magneto Inductive Remote Activation Munition System (MI-RAMS) is a variant of the Remote Munition System (RAMS) that uses electromagnetic induction to control electronic equipment, including demolition charges, munitions, and active barriers. The handheld MI-RAMS receiver consists of a box-shaped device with a fixed bulkhead-style receptacle connector on the top with a non-leaking metal shell threaded in the rear section of the connector and sealed with an O-ring.

With the use of quasi-static AC magnetic fields, MI-RAMS is capable of sending signals through ice, rock, soil, water, and concrete. As a result, MI-RAMS is often used to remotely control ordnance items and communication systems in areas in which radio frequency devices under-perform or fail. These areas include caves, bunkers, tunnels, dense jungle, ice fields, urban structures, and up to 66 feet underwater. The wireless channel created by MI-RAMS does not produce any far field (RF) emissions, which decreases likelihood of detection outside of the operating area. The MI-RAMS transmitters and receivers have also been designed to work with existing communication technology, allowing other types of handsets to link to the system and communicate with each other as long as one MI-RAMS unit is present.

MI-RAMS was designed and modified by researchers at the Army Research Laboratory for U.S. Army Combat Engineer Forces and Army and Navy Special Operations Forces (SEALs) to aid in establishing terrain dominance.
