= R-158 =

Soviet VHF radio transceiver

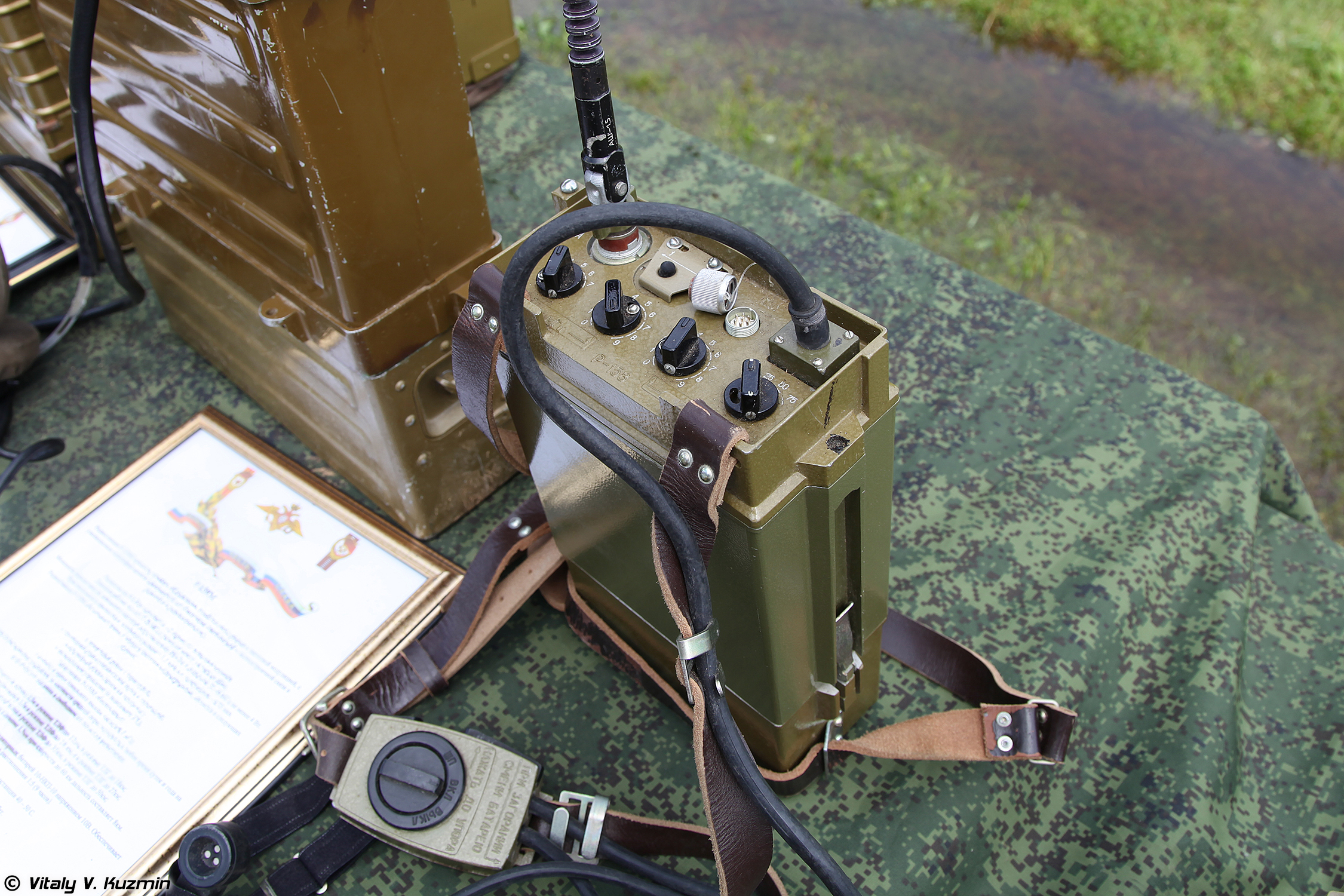
R-158 radio transceiver

R-158 (Р-158) is a portable VHF radio transceiver which entered service with the Soviet military in 1979. It was designed for use at platoon level.

== Technical specifications ==
- Frequency modulation
- Operating modes: Radio telephone and tone calling
- Frequency range: 30 - 79.975 MHz
- Tuning system: PLL frequency synthesis with 25 kHz steps, selected via rotary switches
- 2000 total available channels
- Sensitivity (at a signal-to-noise ratio of 20 dB): 1 μV
- Superheterodyne with two frequency transformations
- Intermediate frequencies: 1st IF - 11.5 MHz; 2nd IF - 1.5 MHz
- RF output power: 1 Watt
- Frequency deviation: 5 kHz
- Spurious emission suppression: 45 dB
- Communication range:
  - With AШ-1.5 (Kulikov's pin antenna) - up to 4 km
  - With λ-shaped antenna - up to 10 km
- Power supply: Nickel-cadmium battery type 10NKGC-1D (10НКГЦ-1Д) at 12 volts, or from a 12 volt vehicle supply
- Current consumption: Receiving mode 60 mA, transmission mode 580 mA
- Operating temperature range: -40 to + 50 °C
- Overall dimensions: 80 х 165 х 263 mm
- Weight of the radio: 3.6 kg
- Transistorized circuitry
