= Radar detector detector =

Sensor used by the police to detect radar detectors

A radar detector detector (RDD) is a device used by police or law enforcement in areas where radar detectors are declared illegal.

Radar detectors are built around a superheterodyne receiver, which has a local oscillator that radiates slightly. It is therefore possible to build a radar-detector detector, which detects such emissions (usually the frequency of the radar type being detected, plus about 10 MHz for the intermediate frequency). Some radar guns are equipped with such a device.

However, like any device that detects stray emissions from electronic equipment, it is easily defeated by using adequate shielding.

== History ==
The VG-2 Interceptor was the first device developed for this purpose, although more current technology such as the Spectre III (Stalcar in Australia) is now available. This form of "electronic warfare" cuts both ways and since detector-detectors use a similar superheterodyne receiver, many early "stealth" radar detectors were equipped with a radar-detector-detector-detector circuit, which shuts down the main radar receiver when the detector-detector's signal is detected, thus preventing detection by such equipment. In the early 1990s, BEL-Tronics, Inc. of Ontario, Canada (where radar detector use is prohibited) found that the local oscillator frequency of the detector could be altered to be out of the range of the VG-2 Interceptor. This resulted in a wave of detector manufacturers changing their local-oscillator frequency. The VG-2 is no longer in production.

The Spectre III detected almost every radar detector certified for operation in the United States by the Federal Communications Commission as of December 2004. However counter technology has evolved rapidly, so that by July 2008, even budget radar detectors were able to avoid detection by the device. Then, in late 2008, the Spectre IV (Elite) was released, citing improved range and reliability over the Spectre III. Radar detector manufacturers produce some models undetectable by the Spectre Elite beyond a distance of a few inches, making them immune in real-world situations.
