= Radio receiver =

Device for receiving radio transmissions

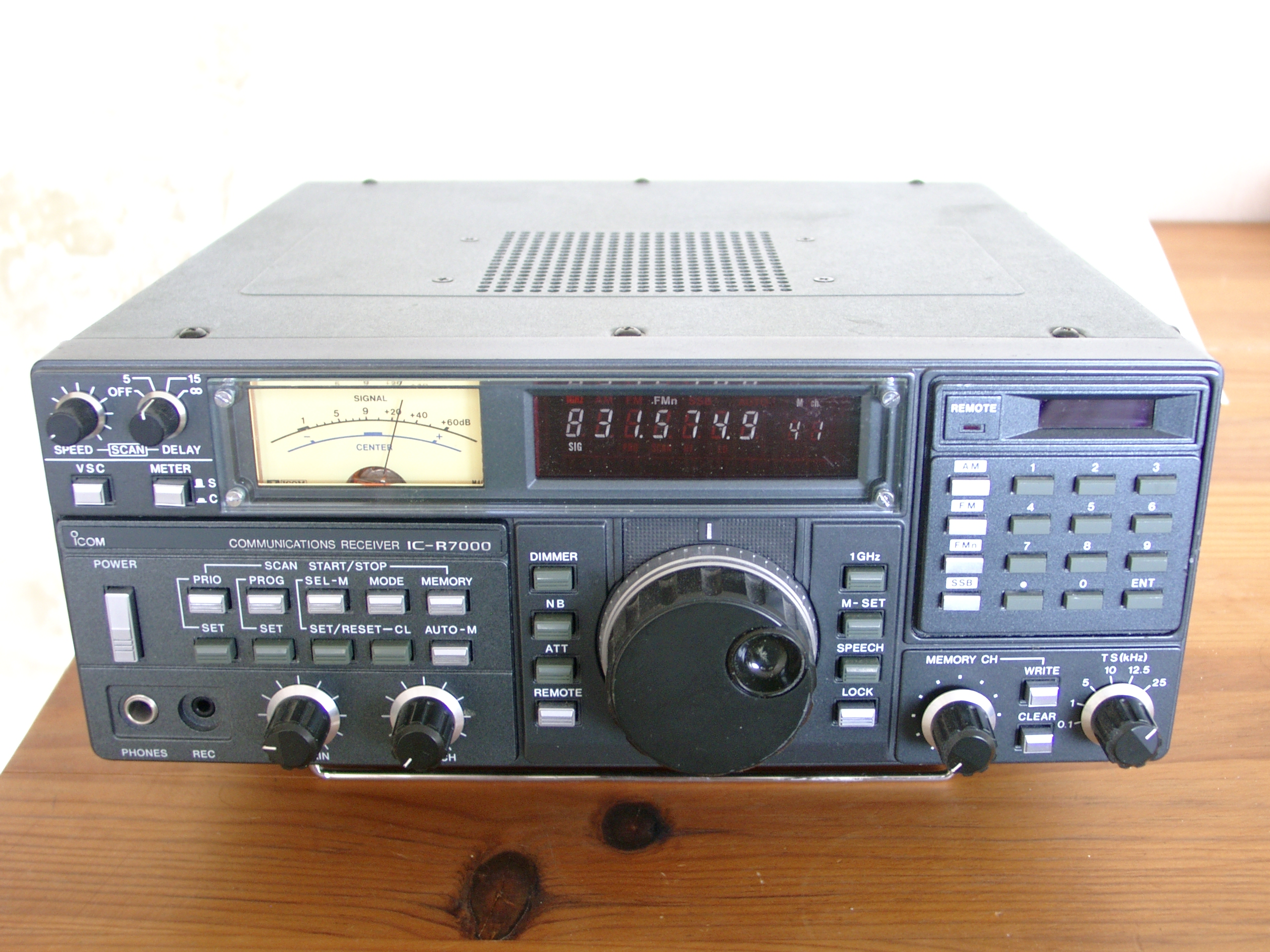
A modern communications receiver, used in two-way radio communication stations to talk with remote locations by shortwave radio.

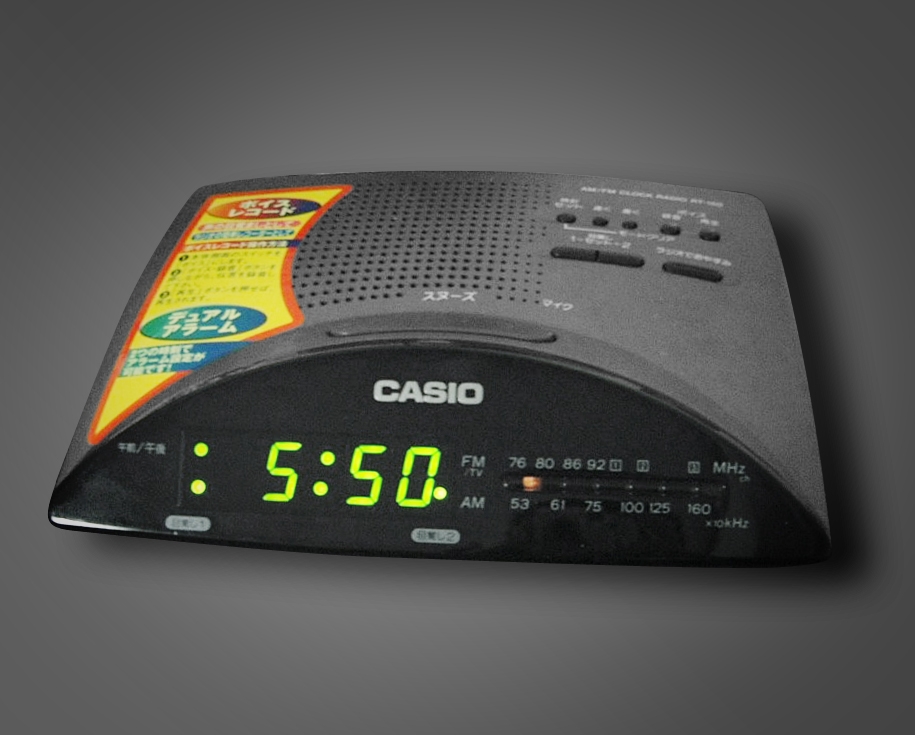
A clock radio, a bedside broadcast AM and FM radio receiver combined with an alarm clock. The clock can be set to turn on the radio in the morning, to wake the owner with audio from a broadcast radio station.

In radio communications, a radio receiver, also known as a receiver, a wireless receiver, or simply a radio, is an electronic device that receives radio waves and converts the information carried by them into a usable form. It is used with an antenna. The antenna responds to radio waves (electromagnetic waves at radio frequencies) and converts them into tiny alternating currents that receiver applies, which then extracts the desired information. The receiver uses electronic filters to separate the desired radio-frequency signal from other signals picked up by the antenna, an electronic amplifier to increase the signal power for further processing, and finally recovers the desired information through demodulation.

Radio receivers are essential components of all radio based-systems. The information produced by the receiver may be in the form of sound, video (television), or digital data. A radio receiver may be a separate piece of electronic equipment, or an electronic circuit within another device. The most familiar type of radio receiver for most people is a broadcast radio receiver, which reproduces sound transmitted by radio broadcasting stations, historically the first mass-market radio application. A broadcast receiver is commonly called a "radio". However, radio receivers are widely used in other areas of modern technology, including televisions, cell phones, wireless modems, radio clocks, and other communications, remote controls, and wireless networking systems.

== Applications ==
Radio has many practical applications, which include broadcasting, voice communication, data communication, radar, radiolocation, medical treatments, and remote control.

== Principles ==
Symbol for an antenna

A radio receiver is connected to an antenna which converts some of the energy from the incoming radio wave into a tiny radio frequency AC voltage which is applied to the receiver's input. An antenna typically consists of an arrangement of metal conductors. The oscillating electric and magnetic fields of the radio wave push the electrons in the antenna back and forth, creating an oscillating voltage.

The antenna may be enclosed inside the receiver's case, as with the ferrite loop antennas of AM radios and the flat inverted F antenna of cell phones; attached to the outside of the receiver, as with whip antennas used on FM radios, or mounted separately and connected to the receiver by a cable, as with rooftop television antennas and satellite dishes.

Practical radio receivers perform three basic functions on the signal from the antenna:

- bandpass filtering,
- amplification, and
- demodulation

=== Reception ===
The signal strength of radio waves decreases the farther they travel from the transmitter, so a radio station can only be received within a limited range of its transmitter. The range depends on the power of the transmitter, the sensitivity of the receiver, atmospheric and internal noise, as well as any geographical obstructions such as hills between transmitter and receiver. AM broadcast band radio waves travel as ground waves which follow the contour of the Earth, so AM radio stations can be reliably received at hundreds of miles distance. Due to their higher frequency, FM band radio signals cannot travel far beyond the visual horizon; limiting reception distance to about 40 miles (64 km), and can be blocked by hills between the transmitter and receiver. However FM radio is less susceptible to interference from radio noise (RFI, sferics, static) and has higher fidelity; better frequency response and less audio distortion, than AM. So in countries that still broadcast AM radio, serious music is typically only broadcast by FM stations, and AM stations specialize in radio news, talk radio, and sports radio. Like FM, DAB signals travel by line of sight so reception distances are limited by the visual horizon to about 30–40 miles (48–64 km).

=== Bandpass filtering ===
Symbol for a bandpass filter used in block diagrams of radio receivers

Radio waves from many transmitters pass through the air simultaneously without interfering with each other and are received by the antenna. These can be separated in the receiver because they have different frequencies; that is, the radio wave from each transmitter oscillates at a different rate. To separate out the desired radio signal, the bandpass filter allows the frequency of the desired radio transmission to pass through, and blocks signals at all other frequencies.

The bandpass filter consists of one or more resonant circuits (tuned circuits). The resonant circuit is connected between the antenna input and ground. When the incoming radio signal is at the resonant frequency, the resonant circuit has high impedance and the radio signal from the desired station is passed on to the following stages of the receiver. At all other frequencies the resonant circuit has low impedance, so signals at these frequencies are conducted to ground.

- Bandwidth and selectivity: See graphs. The information (modulation) in a radio transmission is contained in two narrow bands of frequencies called sidebands (SB) on either side of the carrier frequency (C), so the filter has to pass a band of frequencies, not just a single frequency. The band of frequencies received by the receiver is called its passband (PB), and the width of the passband in kilohertz is called the bandwidth (BW). The bandwidth of the filter must be wide enough to allow the sidebands through without distortion, but narrow enough to block any interfering transmissions on adjacent frequencies (such as S2 in the diagram). The ability of the receiver to reject unwanted radio stations near in frequency to the desired station is an important parameter called selectivity determined by the filter. In modern receivers quartz crystal, ceramic resonator, or surface acoustic wave (SAW) filters are often used which have sharper selectivity compared to networks of capacitor-inductor tuned circuits.
- Tuning: To select a particular station the radio is "tuned" to the frequency of the desired transmitter. The radio has a dial or digital display showing the frequency it is tuned to. Tuning is adjusting the frequency of the receiver's passband to the frequency of the desired radio transmitter. Turning the tuning knob changes the resonant frequency of the tuned circuit. When the resonant frequency is equal to the radio transmitter's frequency the tuned circuit oscillates in sympathy, passing the signal on to the rest of the receiver.

The frequency spectrum of a typical radio signal from an AM or FM radio transmitter. It consists of a component (C) at the carrier wave frequency f_{C}, with the modulation contained in narrow frequency bands called sidebands (SB) just above and below the carrier.

How the bandpass filter selects a single radio signal S1 from all the radio signals S2, S3 ... received by the antenna. From top, the graphs show the voltage from the antenna applied to the filter V_{in}, the transfer function of the filter T, and the voltage at the output of the filter V_{out} as a function of frequency f. The transfer function T is the amount of signal that gets through the filter at each frequency:
$V_\text{out}(f) = \text{T}(f) V_\text{in}(f)$

=== Amplification ===
Symbol for an amplifier

The power of the radio waves picked up by a receiving antenna decreases with the square of its distance from the transmitting antenna. Even with the powerful transmitters used in radio broadcasting stations, if the receiver is more than a few miles from the transmitter the power intercepted by the receiver's antenna is very small, perhaps as low as picowatts or femtowatts. To increase the power of the recovered signal, an amplifier circuit uses electric power from batteries or the wall plug to increase the amplitude (voltage or current) of the signal. In most modern receivers, the electronic components which do the actual amplifying are transistors.

Receivers usually have several stages of amplification: the radio signal from the bandpass filter is amplified to make it powerful enough to drive the demodulator, then the audio signal from the demodulator is amplified to make it powerful enough to operate the speaker. The degree of amplification of a radio receiver is measured by a parameter called its sensitivity, which is the minimum signal strength of a station at the antenna, measured in microvolts, necessary to receive the signal clearly, with a certain signal-to-noise ratio. Since it is easy to amplify a signal to any desired degree, the limit to the sensitivity of many modern receivers is not the degree of amplification but random electronic noise present in the circuit, which can drown out a weak radio signal.

=== Demodulation ===
Symbol for a demodulator

After the radio signal is filtered and amplified, the receiver must extract the information-bearing modulation signal from the modulated radio frequency carrier wave. This is done by a circuit called a demodulator (detector). Each type of modulation requires a different type of demodulator

- an AM receiver that receives an (amplitude modulated) radio signal uses an AM demodulator
- an FM receiver that receives a frequency modulated signal uses an FM demodulator
- an FSK receiver which receives frequency-shift keying (used to transmit digital data in wireless devices) uses an FSK demodulator

Many other types of modulation are also used for specialized purposes.

The modulation signal output by the demodulator is usually amplified to increase its strength, then the information is converted back to a human-usable form by some type of transducer. An audio signal, representing sound, as in a broadcast radio, is converted to sound waves by an earphone or loudspeaker. A video signal, representing moving images, as in a television receiver, is converted to light by a display. Digital data, as in a wireless modem, is applied as input to a computer or microprocessor, which interacts with human users.

==== AM demodulation ====
Envelope detector circuit

How an envelope detector works

The easiest type of demodulation to understand is AM demodulation, used in AM radios to recover the audio modulation signal, which represents sound and is converted to sound waves by the radio's speaker. It is accomplished by a circuit called an envelope detector (see circuit), consisting of a diode (D) with a bypass capacitor (C) across its output.

See graphs. The amplitude modulated radio signal from the tuned circuit is shown at (A). The rapid oscillations are the radio frequency carrier wave. The audio signal (the sound) is contained in the slow variations (modulation) of the amplitude (size) of the waves. If it was applied directly to the speaker, this signal cannot be converted to sound, because the audio excursions are the same on both sides of the axis, averaging out to zero, which would result in no net motion of the speaker's diaphragm. (B) When this signal is applied as input V_{I} to the detector, the diode (D) conducts current in one direction but not in the opposite direction, thus allowing through pulses of current on only one side of the signal. In other words, it rectifies the AC current to a pulsing DC current. The resulting voltage V_{O} applied to the load R_{L} no longer averages zero; its peak value is proportional to the audio signal. (C) The bypass capacitor (C) is charged up by the current pulses from the diode, and its voltage follows the peaks of the pulses, the envelope of the audio wave. It performs a smoothing (low-pass filtering) function, removing the radio frequency carrier pulses, leaving the low frequency audio signal to pass through the load R_{L}. The audio signal is amplified and applied to earphones or a speaker.

=== Automatic gain control (AGC) ===
The signal strength (amplitude) of the radio signal from a receiver's antenna varies drastically, by orders of magnitude, depending on how far away the radio transmitter is, how powerful it is, and propagation conditions along the path of the radio waves. The strength of the signal received from a given transmitter varies with time due to changing propagation conditions of the path through which the radio wave passes, such as multipath interference; this is called fading. In an AM receiver, the amplitude of the audio signal from the detector, and the sound volume, is proportional to the amplitude of the radio signal, so fading causes variations in the volume. In addition as the receiver is tuned between strong and weak stations, the volume of the sound from the speaker would vary drastically. Without an automatic system to handle it, in an AM receiver, constant adjustment of the volume control would be required.

With other types of modulation like FM or FSK the amplitude of the modulation does not vary with the radio signal strength, but in all types the demodulator requires a certain range of signal amplitude to operate properly. Insufficient signal amplitude will cause an increase of noise in the demodulator, while excessive signal amplitude will cause amplifier stages to overload (saturate), causing distortion (clipping) of the signal.

Therefore, almost all modern receivers include a feedback control system which monitors the average level of the radio signal at the detector, and adjusts the gain of the amplifiers to give the optimum signal level for demodulation. This is called automatic gain control (AGC). AGC can be compared to the dark adaptation mechanism in the human eye; on entering a dark room the gain of the eye is increased by the iris opening. In its simplest form, an AGC system consists of a rectifier which converts the RF signal to a varying DC level, a lowpass filter to smooth the variations and produce an average level. This is applied as a control signal to an earlier amplifier stage, to control its gain. In a superheterodyne receiver, AGC is usually applied to the IF amplifier, and there may be a second AGC loop to control the gain of the RF amplifier to prevent it from overloading, too.

In certain receiver designs such as modern digital receivers, a related problem is DC offset of the signal. This is corrected by a similar feedback system.

== Designs ==
=== Tuned radio frequency (TRF) receiver ===
Block diagram of a tuned radio frequency receiver. To achieve enough selectivity to reject stations on adjacent frequencies, multiple cascaded bandpass filter stages had to be used. The dotted line indicates that the bandpass filters must be tuned together.

In the simplest type of radio receiver, called a tuned radio frequency (TRF) receiver, the three functions above are performed consecutively: (1) the mix of radio signals from the antenna is filtered to extract the signal of the desired transmitter; (2) this oscillating voltage is sent through a radio frequency (RF) amplifier to increase its strength to a level sufficient to drive the demodulator; (3) the demodulator recovers the modulation signal (which in broadcast receivers is an audio signal, a voltage oscillating at an audio frequency rate representing the sound waves) from the modulated radio carrier wave; (4) the modulation signal is amplified further in an audio amplifier, then is applied to a loudspeaker or earphone to convert it to sound waves.

Although the TRF receiver is used in a few applications, it has practical disadvantages which make it inferior to the superheterodyne receiver below, which is used in most applications. The drawbacks stem from the fact that in the TRF the filtering, amplification, and demodulation are done at the high frequency of the incoming radio signal. The bandwidth of a filter increases with its center frequency, so as the TRF receiver is tuned to different frequencies its bandwidth varies. Most important, the increasing congestion of the radio spectrum requires that radio channels be spaced very close together in frequency. It is extremely difficult to build filters operating at radio frequencies that have a narrow enough bandwidth to separate closely spaced radio stations. TRF receivers typically must have many cascaded tuning stages to achieve adequate selectivity.

=== The superheterodyne design ===
Block diagram of a superheterodyne receiver. The dotted line indicates that the RF filter and local oscillator must be tuned in tandem.

The superheterodyne receiver, invented in 1918 by Edwin Armstrong is the design used in almost all modern receivers except a few specialized applications.

In the superheterodyne, the radio frequency signal from the antenna is shifted down to a lower "intermediate frequency" (IF), before it is processed. The incoming radio frequency signal from the antenna is mixed with an unmodulated signal generated by a local oscillator (LO) in the receiver. The mixing is done in a nonlinear circuit called the "mixer". The result at the output of the mixer is a heterodyne or beat frequency at the difference between these two frequencies. The process is similar to the way two musical notes at different frequencies played together produce a beat note. This lower frequency is called the intermediate frequency (IF). The IF signal also has the modulation sidebands that carry the information that was present in the original RF signal. The IF signal passes through filter and amplifier stages, then is demodulated in a detector, recovering the original modulation.

The receiver is easy to tune; to receive a different frequency it is only necessary to change the local oscillator frequency. The stages of the receiver after the mixer operates at the fixed intermediate frequency (IF) so the IF bandpass filter does not have to be adjusted to different frequencies. The fixed frequency allows modern receivers to use sophisticated quartz crystal, ceramic resonator, or surface acoustic wave (SAW) IF filters that have very high Q factors, to improve selectivity.

The RF filter on the front end of the receiver is needed to prevent interference from any radio signals at the image frequency. Without an input filter the receiver can receive incoming RF signals at two different frequencies,. The receiver can be designed to receive on either of these two frequencies; if the receiver is designed to receive on one, any other radio station or radio noise on the other frequency may pass through and interfere with the desired signal. A single tunable RF filter stage rejects the image frequency; since these are relatively far from the desired frequency, a simple filter provides adequate rejection. Rejection of interfering signals much closer in frequency to the desired signal is handled by the multiple sharply-tuned stages of the intermediate frequency amplifiers, which do not need to change their tuning. This filter does not need great selectivity, but as the receiver is tuned to different frequencies it must "track" in tandem with the local oscillator. The RF filter also serves to limit the bandwidth applied to the RF amplifier, preventing it from being overloaded by strong out-of-band signals.

Block diagram of a dual-conversion superheterodyne receiver

To achieve both good image rejection and selectivity, many modern superhet receivers use two intermediate frequencies; this is called a dual-conversion or double-conversion superheterodyne. The incoming RF signal is first mixed with an adjustable local oscillator signal in the first mixer to convert it to a high IF frequency, to allow efficient filtering out of the image frequency, then this first IF is mixed with a fixed second local oscillator signal in a second mixer to convert it to a low IF frequency for good bandpass filtering. Some receivers even use triple-conversion.

At the cost of the extra stages, the superheterodyne receiver provides the advantage of greater selectivity than can be achieved with a TRF design. Where very high frequencies are in use, only the initial stage of the receiver needs to operate at the highest frequencies; the remaining stages can provide much of the receiver gain at lower frequencies which may be easier to manage. Tuning is simplified compared to a multi-stage TRF design, and only two stages need to track over the tuning range. The total amplification of the receiver is divided between three amplifiers at different frequencies; the RF, IF, and audio amplifier. This reduces problems with feedback and parasitic oscillations that are encountered in receivers where most of the amplifier stages operate at the same frequency, as in the TRF receiver.

The most important advantage is that better selectivity can be achieved by doing the filtering at the lower intermediate frequency. One of the most important parameters of a receiver is its bandwidth, the band of frequencies it accepts. In order to reject nearby interfering stations or noise, a narrow bandwidth is required. In all known filtering techniques, the bandwidth of the filter increases in proportion with the frequency, so by performing the filtering at the lower $f_\text{IF}$, rather than the frequency of the original radio signal $f_\text{RF}$, a narrower bandwidth can be achieved. Modern FM and television broadcasting, cellphones and other communications services, with their narrow channel widths, would be impossible without the superheterodyne.

== History ==
Radio waves were first identified in German physicist Heinrich Hertz's 1887 series of experiments to prove James Clerk Maxwell's electromagnetic theory. Hertz used spark-excited dipole antennas to generate the waves and micrometer spark gaps attached to dipole and loop antennas to detect them. These precursor radio receivers were primitive devices, more accurately described as radio wave "sensors" or "detectors", as they could only receive radio waves within about 100 feet of the transmitter, and were not used for communication but instead as laboratory instruments in scientific experiments and engineering demonstrations.

- Television receive-only

== See also ==
- Batteryless radio
- Dielectric wireless receiver
- Digital Audio Broadcast (DAB)
- Direct conversion receiver
- Distortion
- List of radios – List of specific models of radios
- Minimum detectable signal
- Radio transmitter design
- Radio receiver design
- Radiogram (furniture)
- Receiver (information theory)
- Telecommunication
- Tuner (radio)
