= Thomas H. Lee (electrical engineer) =

American electrical engineer

- Education: MIT
- Known for: CMOS, microwave
- Awards: Ho-Am Prize in Engineering (2011)
- Scientific career
- Fields: Electrical Engineering
- Workplaces: Stanford University
- Thesis: A fully integrated, inductorless FM receiver
- Doctoral advisor: James Kerr Roberge (MIT)

Thomas H. Lee is a professor at Stanford University. Lee's research focus has been on gigahertz-speed wireline and wireless integrated circuits built in conventional silicon technologies, particularly CMOS; microwave; and RF circuits.

He has written and co-authored several books and papers, and in 2012, concluded a tour of duty as the director of DARPA's Microsystems Technology Office.

== Early life and education ==
Lee received his S.B. (1983), S.M. (1985) and Sc.D. (1990) degrees in electrical engineering, from the Massachusetts Institute of Technology.

He was also awarded an Honoris Causa doctorate from the University of Waterloo in 2012 in recognition of his contributions to wireless technology.

== Career ==
Lee joined Analog Devices in 1990 where he was primarily involved in the design of high-speed clock recovery devices. In 1992, he joined Rambus Inc. where he developed high-speed analog circuitry for 500 megabyte/s CMOS DRAMs. He has also contributed to the development of PLLs in the StrongARM, Alpha and AMD K6/K7/K8 microprocessors.

Lee joined the Department of Electrical Engineering in 1993. In 1994 he founded the Stanford Microwave Integrated Circuits Laboratory.

In 1998, Lee cofounded Matrix Semiconductor (acquired by Sandisk in 2006). He founded ZeroG Wireless (acquired by Microchip Technology) and is a cofounder of Ayla Networks.

Lee was director of DARPA's Microsystems Technology Office from April 2011 to October 2012.

Since early 2016, he has served on the Board of Directors of Xilinx. As of 2018, he holds more than 60 U.S. patents.

== Awards and memberships ==
- 2021 IEEE Gustav Robert Kirchhoff Award
- 2016-2018 Distinguished Lecturer, Solid-State Circuits Society of the IEEE
- 2015 IEEE Fellow for contributions to the design of CMOS radio-frequency integrated circuits.
- April 2011 Awarded the Ho-Am Prize in Engineering, informally known as "the Korean Nobel Prize."
- In 2012 he was awarded the U.S. Secretary of Defense Medal for Exceptional Civilian Service for his work at DARPA, and was awarded an Honoris Causa Doctorate in Electrical Engineering from the University of Waterloo in 2013.
- A freshman seminar he inaugurated, "Things about Stuff" (EE14N), was recognized by the American Society of Engineering Education as one of several "hot courses" in engineering.

== Selected publications ==
- The design of CMOS radio-frequency integrated circuits, Cambridge University Press, 2004, ISBN 0-521-83539-9
- The Design and Implementation of Low-Power CMOS Radio Receivers, co-authored with Derek K. Shaeffer, Springer, 1999, ISBN 0-7923-8518-7
- The Design of Low Noise Oscillators, co-authored with Ali Hajimiri, Springer, 1999, ISBN 0-7923-8455-5
- Planar Microwave Engineering: A Practical Guide to Theory, Measurement, and Circuits, Thomas H. Lee, Cambridge University Press, 2004, ISBN 0-521-83526-7, ISBN 978-0-521-83526-8, 880 pages
