= Thermo-optic coefficient =

The thermo-optic coefficient of a material is the change in refractive index with the response to temperature. The coefficient is a fundamental optical property important for optical and opto-electronics applications such as focusing, optical coupling and modulation of radiation. In laser optics, part of the laser power is absorbed by the optical components which heats them, leading to optical performance changes in proportion to the coefficient.

This value itself also depends on the present temperature of the material and so has second-order behaviours. At low temperatures (0-400 °C), the relationship is linear but at higher ones it exhibits a second-order polynomial behaviour.

== Applications ==
The thermo-optic coefficient is important for the design of temperature sensors based on optical effects, thermo-optic switches, and thermo-optic modulators, as well as avoiding thermal effects in fiber-optic communication.

The relationship can be used in temperature measurement by Fibre Bragg gratings (FBGs) where if no physical strain is applied, a Bragg's Wavelength shift of 1 pm per 0.1 °C temperature change can be measured.
