= Multi mode interferometer =

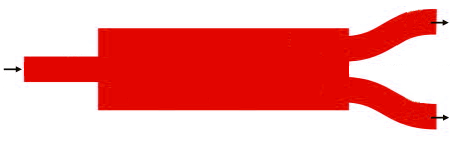
Diagram of a 1x2 Multi Mode Interferometer, with one input and two outputs

A multi-mode interferometer (MMI), also known as a multimode interference coupler, is a micro-scale structure in which light waves can travel, such that the optical power is split or combined in a predictable way. In an MMI, light is confined and guided, and thus the MMI is essentially a broad optical waveguide. For example, an ideal 1x2 MMI would be a 50-50 splitter, such that light enters along one path and exits along two paths, with half the power in each exit path. These entrance and exit paths are narrow waveguides, and the MMI itself is in the shape of a broad rectangular box. An ideal 50-50 splitter is nearly impossible in practice, due to the complex behavior of light. Optical loss will always occur as light travels through an MMI, which means that the total output power of a real MMI is less than the total input power. Additionally, the light propagates through the rectangular box in multiple modes, while also experiencing reflection and interference. This leads to mathematical models and equations that are too complex to solve by hand, and thus MMIs are typically designed through computer simulations.

MMIs are usually described by their coupling ratio, in which the output power of one port is compared to the total output power (summing over all output ports.) An ideal 1x2 MMI would have a 50% coupling ratio for each output port. For a real 1x2 MMI, values such as 48% and 52% may occur, due to imperfections in fabrication and manufacturing.
