= Nanophotonic coherent imager =

Laser system for scanning 3D objects

Nanophotonic coherent imagers (NCI) are image sensors that determine both the appearance and distance of an imaged scene at each pixel. It uses an array of LIDARs (scanning laser beams) to gather this information about size and distance, using an optical concept called coherence (wherein waves of the same frequency align perfectly).

NCIs can capture 3D images of objects with sufficient accuracy to permit the creation of high resolution replicas using 3D printing technology.

The detection of both intensity and relative delay enables applications such as high-resolution 3D reflective and transmissive imaging as well as index contrast imaging.

== Prototype ==
An NCI using a 4×4 pixel grid of 16 grating couplers operates based on a modified time-domain frequency modulated continuous wave (FMCW) ranging scheme, where concurrent time-domain measurements of both period and the zero-crossing time of each electrical output of the nanophotonic chip allows the NCI to overcome the resolution limits of frequency domain detection. Each pixel on the chip is an independent interferometer that detects the phase and frequency of the signal in addition to the intensity. Each LIDAR pixel spanned only a few hundred microns such that the area fit in area of 300 microns square.

The prototype achieved 15 μm depth resolution and 50 μm lateral resolution (limited by the pixel spacing) at up to 0.5-meter range. It was capable of detecting a 1% equivalent refractive index contrast at 1 mm thickness.
