= Crystal filter =

Electronic filter

A 9 MHz crystal ladder filter with four matched crystals.

A crystal filter is an electronic filter that uses the mechanical resonance of piezoelectric crystals, usually quartz, to shape a circuit's frequency response. Its early development was driven by carrier telephony, which required steep filters to separate voice channels spaced just a few kilohertz apart. Crystal resonators have a much higher Q factor than ordinary tuned circuits made from inductors and capacitors, allowing accurately controlled passbands and stopbands with steep transition regions.

Crystal filters are used in radio receivers and transmitters, carrier-telephone equipment, and other communication systems. Crystal filters can be built from individual matched crystals in ladder or lattice networks, or from several resonators formed on a single quartz blank as a monolithic crystal filter. Amateur radio operators also build crystal filters for superheterodyne intermediate-frequency and single-sideband equipment.

== History ==
=== Piezoelectric resonators ===
In 1880, Pierre and Jacques Curie demonstrated that certain crystals produced an electric charge when mechanically stressed. The converse effect, in which an applied voltage produces mechanical motion, made it possible to excite and detect the natural vibration of a crystal electrically. A. M. Nicolson demonstrated electrical resonance in a Rochelle salt crystal in 1919. Walter Guyton Cady subsequently studied resonators cut from quartz, which was more stable and durable. In 1922, he described the electrical behavior of quartz plates and proposed using a divided-electrode resonator as a coupling element between two circuits. This was the first published proposal to use a quartz crystal as part of a filter.

=== Early crystal wave filters ===
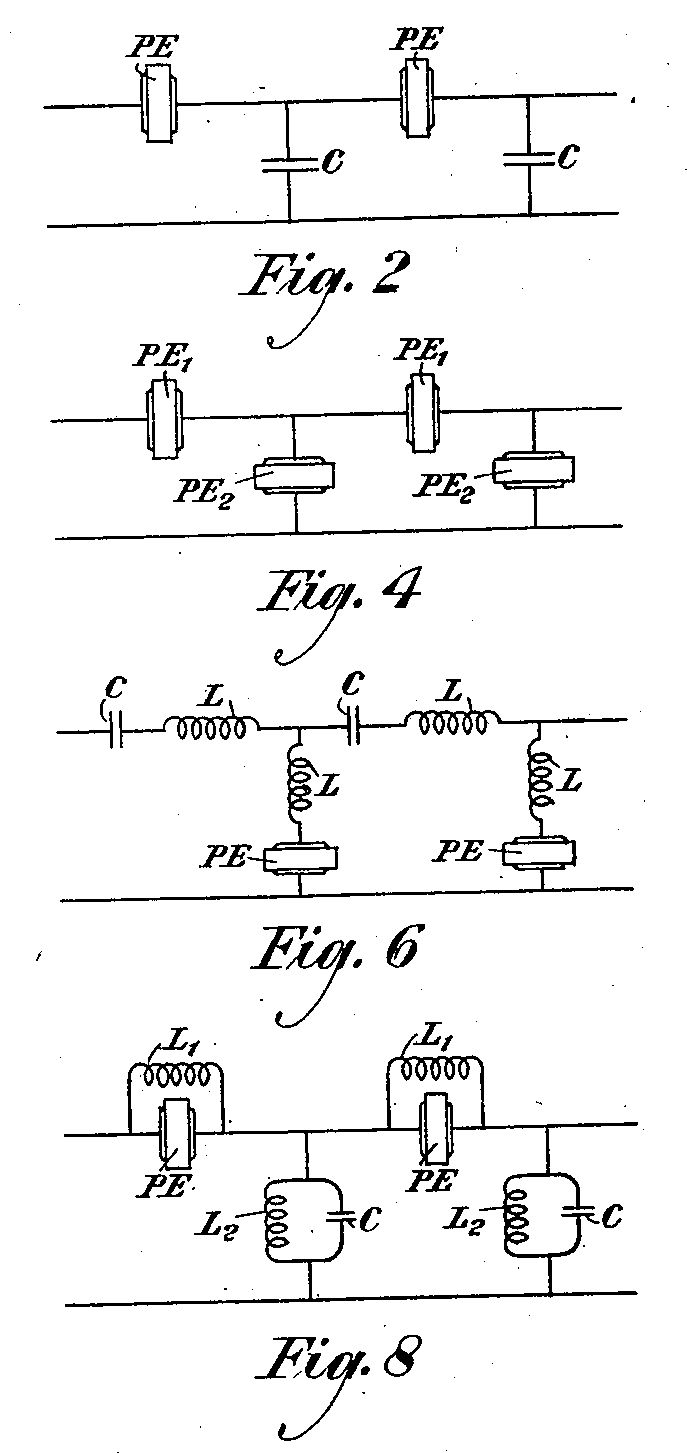
Crystal ladder-filter circuits. From Espenschied's 1927 patent application

A wave filter, the contemporary term for a frequency-selective electrical network, originally inductor and capacitor or LC, passed a chosen range of frequencies while attenuating frequencies outside it. The development of crystal wave filters was driven by carrier telephony. Carrier systems placed several telephone calls on one wire pair by assigning each call a different frequency range. Systems introduced during the 1910s used inductor-capacitor wave filters at frequencies of roughly 10 to 40 kHz. As more channels were added, the limited Q factor of practical inductors made it difficult to obtain sufficiently steep separation between adjacent channels. In 1927, Lloyd Espenschied of Bell Laboratories and Clarence W. Hansell of RCA independently filed patent applications for crystal filters. Espenschied described several ladder arrangements and added inductors in series or parallel with the crystals to increase their bandwidth. Hansell used a balanced bridge circuit in which unwanted crystal capacitance could be cancelled by signal subtraction, anticipating lattice circuits later used in many discrete crystal filters. These early circuits were highly selective, but their passbands were too narrow for telephone speech. An Espenschied filter at 60 kHz, for example, had a bandwidth of about 480 Hz, while a telephone channel required several kilohertz. The problem was not just obtaining greater selectivity, but obtaining a voice bandwidth greater than 3000 Hz while retaining high attenuation in nearby channels.

=== Lattice filters and wider bandwidth ===
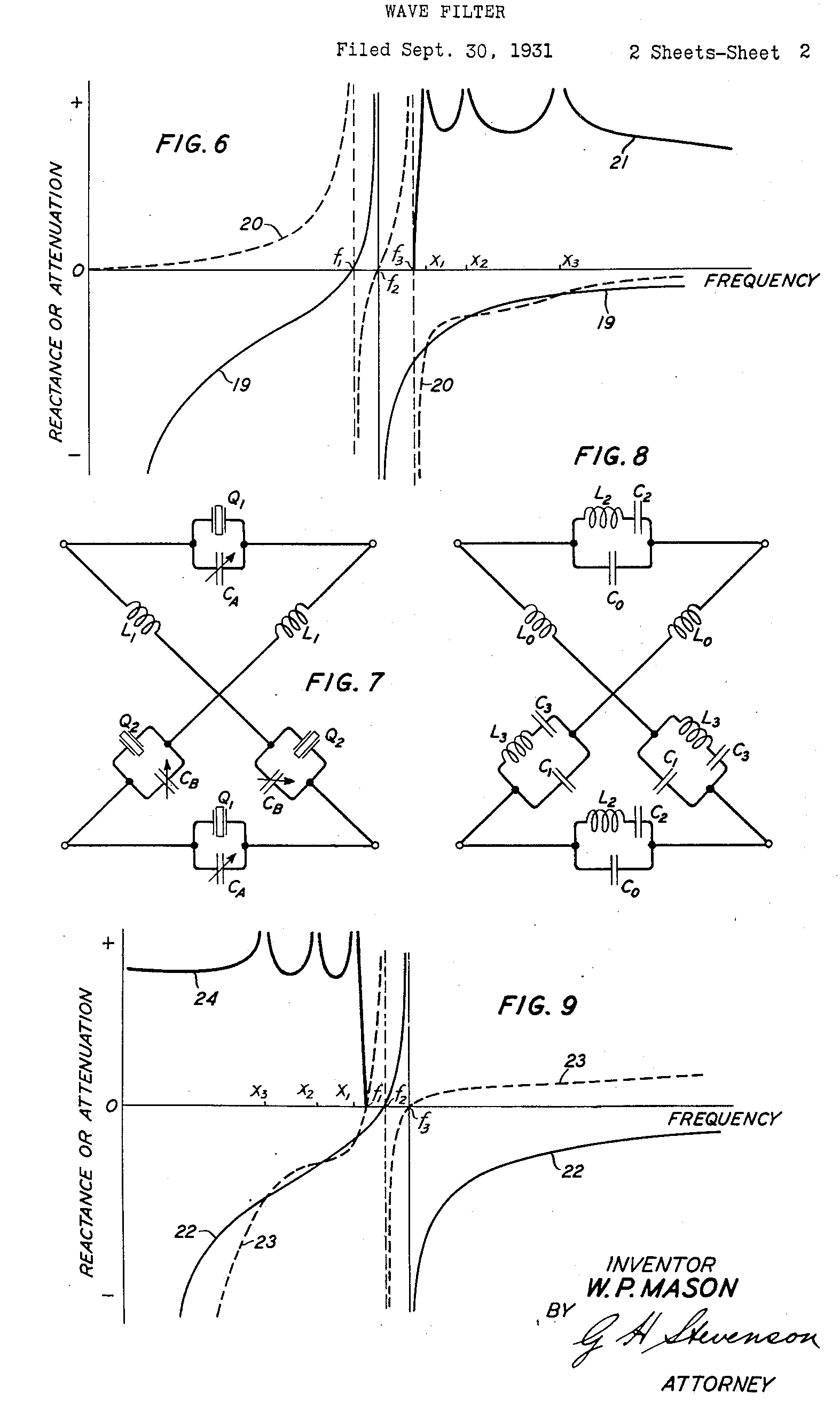
Mason's lattice crystal filter schematics from his 1931 patent filing. These filters allowed wider bandwidth than the ladder filters

Warren P. Mason increased the bandwidth by combining LC elements with quartz resonators into a lattice network. Mason alternated the resonances of one pair of lattice arms against those of the other pair, so that wanted frequencies passed through the network while unwanted frequencies were cancelled by signal subtraction. He began this work in 1929 and described it fully in a 1934 paper.

Mason applied the image-parameter wave-filter methods developed by Otto Julius Zobel. He described two forms, a narrowband form using crystals and capacitors, and a wider-band form combining crystals with LC tuned circuits. The narrowband form was generally limited to about 0.2 to 0.4 percent of its center frequency. The wider form could provide bandwidths of roughly 2 to 6 percent over the 60-to-300 kHz range, suitable for telephone voice channels.

This filter was the basis for Bell System's standard carrier group. Twelve voice channels, each occupying approximately 200 to 3,400 Hz and spaced 4 kHz apart, were placed between 60 and 108 kHz. Each channel required a filter with a passband wide enough for speech and stopband attenuation steep enough to reject the adjacent channel. Bell's long-distance single-sideband channel bank using these filters entered manufacturing in 1938. Mason's lattice designs formed the basis of most crystal filters developed during the following twenty years.

Mason published this work in his 1942 book Electromechanical Transducers and Wave Filters. The book explained common analysis methods for electrical, mechanical, and acoustic systems and treated piezoelectric resonators as electromechanical circuit elements. It included crystal resonators in lattice and ladder filters, and placed crystal-filter design within a broader context of electromechanical circuits.

=== Evolution of the crystal channel filter ===
The Bell System's first long-distance twelve-channel bank entered production in 1938. Each voice channel was modulated directly into its assigned position in the standard 60-to-108 kHz group band, so twelve related crystal-filter designs were needed, one for each 4-kHz-wide position. The original filter was a large 16th-order design containing two crystal-lattice sections, inductors, capacitors, and four natural-quartz plates. It occupied about 3,400 cm³ and weighed 18.5 kg.

The circuit was simplified in 1944. It used four natural quartz crystals in a 12th-order network, arranged in a single lattice, and was the basis of later Bell System discrete channel filters. Subsequent designs retained this basic circuit arrangement while reducing the size and cost of the components, packaging, and wiring. The 1953 version was about one-fifth the size and half the cost of the 1944. Cultured quartz later replaced increasingly scarce natural quartz, and the 1978 design used computer-aided synthesis, component optimization, printed wiring, and much smaller magnetic components. Its volume was only 39 cm³, about one eighty-seventh that of the 1938 filter.

Development of Bell System discrete crystal channel filters.
Year	Circuit	Order	Crystal resonators	Material	Approximate volume
1938	Two lattice sections	16th	4	Natural quartz	3,400 cm³
1944	Single lattice	12th	4	Natural quartz	2,360 cm³
1953	Single lattice	12th	4	Natural quartz	600 cm³
1960	Single lattice	12th	4	Cultured quartz	490 cm³
1977 CCITT	Single lattice	16th	6	Cultured quartz	36 cm³
1978 Bell System	Single lattice	12th	4	Cultured quartz	39 cm³

The Bell System filters continued to use direct modulation into the twelve final channel bands. By contrast, the 1977 filter designed to meet CCITT requirements was used with two stages of modulation. All channels first passed through the same upper-sideband filter at 128–132 kHz and were then translated to their final positions. Only one filter design was therefore required, although the stricter CCITT stopband requirements called for a 16th-order network with six crystals.

=== Monolithic crystal filters ===
A monolithic crystal filter contains two or more resonators formed on the same quartz plate. The plate's mechanical vibration couples the resonators. Split-electrode crystals used in telephone channel filters replaced two separate crystal plates with a single plate, but still operated as a single resonant element. In balanced circuit implementations, this saved crystals, but did not increase the order of the filter. In a monolithic filter, the interaction between several different resonant modes produces the filter response.

Coupled resonators on a single quartz plate had been demonstrated by 1946, although practical commercial components were not available until the 1960s. In 1962, Y. Nakazawa published a monolithic two-pole filter and a six-pole filter built from three two-pole sections. These filters operated 10.7 MHz. Later designs varied the metal electrode pattern and metal thickness to adjust the frequency response. The term monolithic crystal filter appeared in the technical literature during the mid-1960s.

Commercial four- and six-pole monolithic filters were available in Japan by 1965, and standardized 10.7 MHz filters were being sold by 1967. Most products used two-pole elements that could be cascaded to produce higher-order responses. Their small size and compatibility with transistor and integrated-circuit intermediate-frequency amplifiers led to widespread use in communications equipment.

Bell Laboratories developed an eight-pole monolithic filter for the A6 carrier-telephone channel bank. It operated near 8 MHz and performed the sideband-selection function previously provided by the much larger discrete crystal filters used at frequencies between 60 and 108 kHz. The monolithic design made this the smallest channel filter, but required two frequency conversions. The filters were manufactured on equipment developed specifically for the A6 program.

An alternative was the polylithic filter, in which several separate quartz resonators or monolithic sections were combined in one assembly. This retained much of the size reduction of a monolithic design while allowing the individual resonators to be manufactured and adjusted separately. Polylithic filters were used in some frequency-division multiplex and microwave systems.

== Radio use ==
Crystal filters were used in amateur and communications receivers during the early 1930s, before their large-scale use in telephone channel banks. These filters usually placed a single crystal in the intermediate frequency path of a superheterodyne receiver. A phasing or rejection control cancelled the crystal's parallel capacitance. The resulting filter separated closely spaced CW signals more effectively than the tuned LC transformers then used in most receivers.

The filters were often adjustable because CW and voice reception required different bandwidths. A receiver described in 1933 used a single crystal resonating near 525 kHz and varied the response from a few tens of hertz for CW reception to 1,200 hertz for voice. A 1936 construction article described a similar filter as an add-on unit for receivers using an intermediate frequency of 465 kHz. These circuits offered high selectivity, but their sharply peaked response and adjustable phasing made the adjustment important.

Engineers needed a wider bandwidth and adjustable response for voice reception. A filter described in 1937 operated at an intermediate frequency of 1.56 MHz and provided an adjustable bandwidth from 300 to 7 kHz. In 1939, another amateur design broadened a commercial 456 kHz crystal filter that had been too narrow for intelligible voice reception. These designs used a single crystal together with LC circuits rather than a multi-crystal network.

By the early 1950s, amateur designs were using several matched crystals in lattice filters, referencing the work of Mason. In a lattice, two crystal pairs form the arms of a balanced bridge. Their series and parallel resonances are staggered so that signals in the passband combine at the output while signals outside it cancel. Filters described in QST in 1951 used matched surplus crystals in the 430-to-490 kHz range and produced voice passbands of roughly 2.5 to 5 kHz with much steeper attenuation outside the passband than a single-crystal filter. They were intended both for improving receiver selectivity and for use in transmitters.

The second part of the 1951 article incorporated a narrow-band lattice filter into a single-sideband transmitter. The filter selected one modulation sideband while rejecting the other.

During the 1950s and 1960s, improved AT-cut resonators extended crystal filters to higher radio frequencies. Filters were developed for single-sideband equipment in the 1.5-to-6 MHz range and for receiver intermediate frequencies including 9.0, 10.7, 11.5, 21.4, and 30 MHz. The growth of mobile, military, radar, and navigation equipment created a separate industry producing packaged crystal filters for radio use.

Modern radio crystal filters may use discrete lattice or ladder networks, cascaded two-pole monolithic elements, or a complete monolithic crystal filter. Because useful filters can be built from selected inexpensive crystals and a small number of capacitors, ladder filters remain common amateur-radio construction projects for intermediate-frequency and single-sideband equipment.

In commercial receivers, crystal filters provide IF selectivity or serve as a roofing filter ahead of further gain and signal processing. Lower-cost ceramic filters are widely used where the accuracy of quartz is not required. David Gordon-Smith published techniques for the design of more symmetric crystal ladder filters in 2011. Also covered are techniques for sorting and selecting mass-produced crystals.

A modern amateur transceiver may use several forms of crystal filter in the same signal path. The uBITX double-conversion transceiver kit uses a commercial two-pole crystal filter at its 45 MHz IF, serving as a relatively broad roofing filter. After conversion to a second intermediate frequency of 12 MHz, sideband selection is performed by a six-section ladder filter made from eight matched, inexpensive crystals intended for microprocessor clocks. The same filters are used for receive and transmit.

The most common use of crystal filters are at frequencies of 9 or 10.7 MHz to provide selectivity in communications receivers, or at higher frequencies as a roofing filter in receivers using up-conversion. The vibrating frequencies of the crystal are determined by its "cut" (physical shape), such as the common AT cut used for crystal filters designed for radio communications. The cut also determines some temperature characteristics, which affect the stability of the resonant frequency. However, quartz has an inherently high temperature stability; its shape does not change much with temperatures found in typical radios.

By contrast, less expensive ceramic-based filters are commonly used with a frequency of 10.7 MHz to provide filtering of unwanted frequencies in consumer FM receivers. Additionally, a lower frequency (typically 455 kHz or nearby) can be used as the second intermediate frequency and have a piezoelectric-based filter. Ceramic filters at 455 kHz can achieve similar narrow bandwidths to crystal filters at 10.7 MHz.

== See also ==
- Bandpass filter
- Crystal oscillator
