= Ceramic resonator =

Type of electronic component

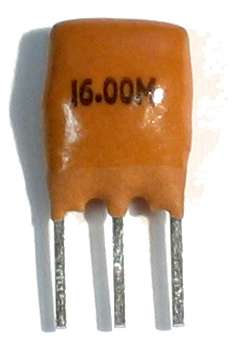
- A 16 MHz ceramic resonator
- Component type: Electromechanical
- Working principle: Piezoelectricity, Resonance

A ceramic resonator is an electronic component consisting of a piece of a piezoelectric ceramic material with two or more metal electrodes attached. When connected in an electronic oscillator circuit, resonant mechanical vibrations in the device generate an oscillating signal of a specific frequency. Like the similar quartz crystal, they are used in oscillators for purposes such as generating the clock signal used to control timing in computers and other digital logic devices, or generating the carrier signal in analog radio transmitters and receivers.

Ceramic resonators are made of high-stability piezoelectric ceramics, generally lead zirconate titanate (PZT) which functions as a mechanical resonator. In operation, mechanical vibrations induce an oscillating voltage in the attached electrodes due to the piezoelectricity of the material. The thickness of the ceramic substrate determines the resonant frequency of the device.

== Packages ==
A typical ceramic resonator package has either two or three connections. The two pin devices are typically just the resonators themselves, while three and sometimes four pin devices are filters, often used in AM and FM broadcast radios as well as many other RF applications. They come in both surface-mount and through-hole varieties with a number of different footprints. The oscillation takes place across two of the pins (connections). The third pin (if present; typically the center pin) is connected to ground.

== Applications ==
Ceramic resonators can be used as the source of the clock signal for digital circuits such as microprocessors where the frequency accuracy is not critical. Quartz has a 0.001% frequency tolerance, while PZT has a 0.5% tolerance.

They are used in timing circuitry for a wide array of applications such as TVs, VCRs, automotive electronic devices, telephones, copiers, cameras, voice synthesizers, communication equipment, remote controls and toys. A ceramic resonator is often used in place of quartz crystals as a reference clock or signal generator in electronic circuitry due to its low cost and smaller size.

The lower Q and higher frequency range achievable can be beneficial in use of TCXOs, temperature-compensated crystal oscillators. The frequency of the oscillator can be "pulled" in wider range than with high-Q crystal. This allows wider range of adjustments, which may be critical in devices operating in extreme (especially low) temperatures where the crystal's own temperature-frequency dependence could take it outside of the pullable range for the desired frequency.

== Ceramic filters ==
Ceramic resonators look similar to ceramic filters. Ceramic filters are frequently used in the IF stages of superheterodyne receivers. Originally ceramic filters were used as very low cost filters for broadcast radio receivers, both medium wave sets with typical IFs of 455 kHz and FM broadcast sets with IF stages at around 10.7 MHz. However, as the performance has significantly improved, they are used in many other RF applications as well.

== See also ==
- Electronic oscillator
- Crystal oscillator
- Crystal filter
