= Distributed active transformer =

Distributed active transformer is a circuit topology that allows low-voltage transistors to be used to generate large amounts of RF (radio frequency) power. Its main use has been in making integrated CMOS power amplifier for wireless applications, such as GSM/GPRS cellular phones.

At the time it was introduced, the distributed active transformer performance improved more than an order of magnitude relative to the previous state of the art.

Output power of up to 2.2 Watt in S-band was demonstrated back in 2002, utilizing Distributed active transformer which combine the power of four differential power amplifiers.
