= Schleicher Electronic =

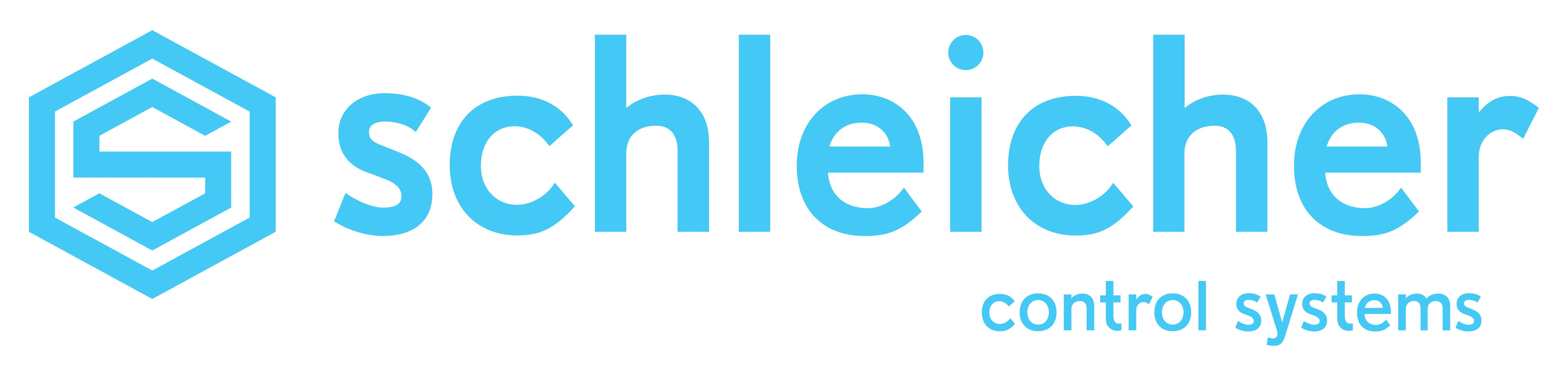
- Type: GmbH & Co. KG
- Industry: Electrical engineering
- Founded: 1937
- Headquarters: Berlin,
- Key people: Sven Dübbers
- Products: Control systems (CNC), relays, safety engineering
- Revenue: 20 million euros (2009)
- Number of employees: around 120 (2011)
- Website: www.schleicher.technology

Schleicher Electronic GmbH und Co. KG is a German technology company based in Berlin.

The company develops and produces control systems (CNC) used in automation engineering. In addition, Schleicher Electronic also works in the field of functional safety engineering.

Schleicher Electronic collaborates with internationally known research facilities, such as the Fraunhofer Institutes and the Technische Universität Berlin. The company is also a member of SERCOS International e.V. – an open, real-time interface for drives.

== History ==
The company was founded as “Schleicher Relais Werke” by Otto Schleicher in 1937. In 1958, “Schleicher Relais Werke” presented the MZ 54 time-delay relay at the first industrial trade fair in Hannover. It was the first multifunctional time-delay relay, and due to its purely electromechanical basis, is still used in many ways. Electromechanical (and later electronic) time-delay relays made “Schleicher Relais Werke” internationally known.

In 1976, Schleicher developed and marketed a programmable controller (PLC). In collaboration with the Fraunhofer Institute, Schleicher developed a numerical control (NC) kernel in 1983. They are one of the few CNC manufacturers with their own software kernel.

In 1986, the company received the Berlin-Brandenburg Innovation Prize for an “Online Curve Interpolator” for generating free-form curves (in NC machines). In 1988, the Promodul-U CNC-RC-PLC system was introduced, and safety control devices were introduced to the market in 1989. In 1995, production was changed from assembly-belt production to group-workstations, a very new concept at the time. Starting in 2003, Schleicher Electronic was acquired by Wieland Group. Wieland incorporated Schleicher into the parent company in certain product areas and discontinued a series of product developments. At that time, Schleicher was mainly a production and development company and dependent on the sales department of Wieland, until they were sold to Aurelius AG in 2007. After reorganization, the expansion of the sales department and establishment in the Asian market, Aurelius AG sold the company in the summer of 2013 to entrepreneur Sven Dübbers.
