= Modulation error ratio =

The modulation error ratio (MER) is a measure used to quantify the performance of a digital radio (or digital TV) transmitter or receiver in a communications system using digital modulation (such as QAM). A signal sent by an ideal transmitter or received by a receiver would have all constellation points precisely at the ideal locations, however various imperfections in the implementation (such as noise, low image rejection ratio, phase noise, carrier suppression, distortion, etc.) or signal path cause the actual constellation points to deviate from the ideal locations.

Transmitter MER can be measured by specialized equipment, which demodulates the received signal in a similar way to how a real radio demodulator does it. Demodulated and detected signal can be used as a reasonably reliable estimate for the ideal transmitted signal in MER calculation.

== Definition ==
An error vector is a vector in the I-Q plane between the ideal constellation point and the point received by the receiver. The Euclidean distance between the two points is its magnitude.

The modulation error ratio is equal to the ratio of the root mean square (RMS) power (in Watts) of the reference vector to the power (in Watts) of the error. It is defined in dB as:

$$\mathrm{MER (dB)} = 10 \log_{10} \left ( {P_\mathrm{signal} \over P_\mathrm{error}}  \right )$$

where P_{error} is the RMS power of the error vector, and P_{signal} is the RMS power of ideal transmitted signal.

MER is defined as a percentage in a compatible (but reciprocal) way:

$$\mathrm{MER (\%)} = \sqrt{ {P_\mathrm{error} \over P_\mathrm{signal}} } \times 100\%$$

with the same definitions.

MER is closely related to error vector magnitude (EVM), but MER is calculated from the average power of the signal. MER is also closely related to signal-to-noise ratio. MER includes all imperfections including deterministic amplitude imbalance, quadrature error and distortion, while noise is random by nature.

== See also ==
- Error vector magnitude
- Carrier to Noise Ratio
- Signal-to-noise ratio
