= Thin-wall injection molding =

Specialized form of conventional injection molding

Thin wall injection molding is a specialized form of conventional injection molding that focuses on mass-producing plastic parts that are thin and light so that material cost savings can be made and cycle times can be as short as possible. Shorter cycle times mean higher productivity and lower costs per part.

The definition of a thin wall is really about the size of the part compared to its wall thickness. For any particular plastic part, as the wall thickness reduces the harder it is to manufacture using the injection molding process. The size of a part puts a limit on how thin the wall thickness can be. For packaging containers thin wall means wall thicknesses that are less than 0.025 inch (0.62mm) with a flow length to wall thickness greater than 200.

== Markets ==
The trend towards thin wall molding continues to increase in many plastic industries as plastic material and energy costs continue to rise and delivery lead times are squeezed.

The following industries make use of thin wall molding:

- food packaging ( e.g. food containers and lids)
- automotive (e.g. both structural and non-structural car parts)
- mobile telecommunications (e.g. mobile phone housings)
- medical (e.g. syringes)
- computing equipment (e.g. computer housings)

== Benefits ==
- Cheap, safe and clean plastic parts.
- Thin wall molding reduces resource consumption and cuts weight, reducing fuel usage and carbon emissions in shipping – further supporting sustainability efforts.
- Allows faster cycle times compared with thicker walled plastic parts. This is good for injection molders because it reduces their delivery lead time and cost per part.
- Lighter parts reduce fuel emissions in automotive applications.
- Made from recyclable plastics such as polypropylene (PP) in food packaging.
- Some thin wall parts can be made from sustainable plastics.

== Disadvantages ==
- Environmental litter.
- High capital investment cost for injection molders. Thin wall molding requires specialized molding machines, injection molds and robots that can withstand the high stresses, fast cycle times and 24/7 production schedules.
- To make thin wall parts requires highly specialized molding technicians.

== Examples ==
Plastic resins suitable for thin-wall molding should have high-flow properties, particularly low melt viscosity. In addition, they need to be robust enough to avoid degradation from the heat generated by high shear rates (high injection speeds)

Some plastic manufacturers make plastics specifically for thin wall applications that have excellent flow properties inside the mold cavity. For example, plastic manufacturer Sabic has a polypropylene food contact grade plastic which is specifically designed for thin wall margarine containers and lids.

Another plastic manufacturer, Bayer, makes a blend of Polycarbonate (PC) and Acrylonitrile butadiene styrene (ABS) specifically designed to make thin wall mobile housings.

== Equipment ==
=== Plastic injection molding machine ===
Compared to conventional injection molding, thin wall molding requires molding machines that are designed and built to withstand higher stresses and injection pressures. The molding machines computer control should also be precise in order to make quality parts. For this reason these molding machines are more expensive than general purpose machines.

Thin-wall-capable machines usually also have accumulator-assisted clamps to accommodate fast cycle times.

Regular maintenance schedules must be completed so that the machine and part quality does not suffer. These machines usually work 24/7 so they need to be well maintained.

=== Injection mold design ===
As with the injection molding machines, injection molds need to be robust enough to withstand high stresses and pressures. Heavy mold construction with through hardened tool steels will ensure a long lasting mold.

The mold must also have a well designed cooling system so that heat can be quickly extracted from the hot plastic part allowing fast cycle times. To achieve this, cooling channels need to be designed close to the molding surface. Cleaning the mould on a daily basis is also a critical requirement to maintain the part quality.

=== Robotics ===
In countries where manual labour is expensive, robots are commonly used to remove the plastic parts from the mold and order them into equal stacks. These robots are fixed to the molding machine and need to be fast and reliable.

== Plastic injection molding process ==
The range of process parameters, which are employed for thin wall molded parts, is considerably narrower than that of conventional injection molding because thin parts are difficult for the injection unit of the machine to fill compared to thicker parts. Even with optimally designed parts and molds, it is still more difficult to produce parts with thin walls.

Consistent injection speeds and pressures are required to maintain the quality of the parts produced from thin wall molding. A properly trained molding technician who understands and operates the machine within the confines of the narrow processing window at which the molded product's production cost-effectiveness is optimized will ensure that the process produces quality parts during the production.
