= Turnaround time =

Time to complete a request in computing

Turnaround time (TAT) is the amount of time taken to complete a process or fulfill a request. The concept thus overlaps with lead time and can be contrasted with cycle time.

== Meaning in computing ==
In computing, turnaround time is the total time taken between the submission of a program/process/thread/task for execution and the return of the complete output to the customer/user. It may vary for various programming languages depending on the developer of the software or the program. Turnaround time may simply deal with the total time it takes for a program to provide the required output to the user after the program is started.

Turnaround time is one of the metrics used to evaluate an operating system's scheduling algorithms.

In case of batch systems, turnaround time will include time taken in forming batches, batch execution and printing results.

With increasing computerization of analytical instruments the distinction between a computing context and a "non-computing" context is becoming semantic. An example of a "non-computing" context of turnaround time is the time a particular analysis in a laboratory, such as a medical laboratory, other commercial laboratories or a public health laboratory takes to result. Laboratories may publish an average turnaround time to inform their clients, e.g. a health care worker ordering the test, after what time a result can be expected. A prolonged turnaround time may give the requester a clue that a specimen was not received, that an analysis met with problems within the lab including that the result was unusual, and the test was repeated for quality control.

== Comparisons with other metrics of time ==
Lead Time vs Turnaround Time: Lead Time is the amount of time, defined by the supplier or service provider, that is required to meet a customer request or demand. Lead-time is basically the time gap between the order placed by the customer and the time when the customer get the final delivery, on the other hand the Turnaround Time is in order to get a job done and deliver the output, once the job is submitted for processing center according to the customer request.

Turnaround Time vs Response Time: Turnaround time is the amount of time elapsed from the time of submission to the time of completion whereas response time is the average time elapsed from submission until the first response is produced.

Turnaround Time vs Wait Time: Waiting time is amount of time a process has been waiting in the ready queue.

Reasons of Delays: In case of warehouses, there are several reasons, due to which TAT can increase. First of all, if laborers or equipment are not working properly, and if the maximum efficiency could not be reached, the process would be delayed. Secondly, the infrastructure, improper infrastructure could be an obstacle for the TAT reduction.

== See also ==
- Takt time
- Logistics
- Cycle time variation
