= Drum sequencer =

Drum sequencer can refer to:

In electronic music:

- Drum machine

In electromechanical controllers:

- Drum sequencer (controller)
- A cam timer controller device
