= Automation technician =

Profession

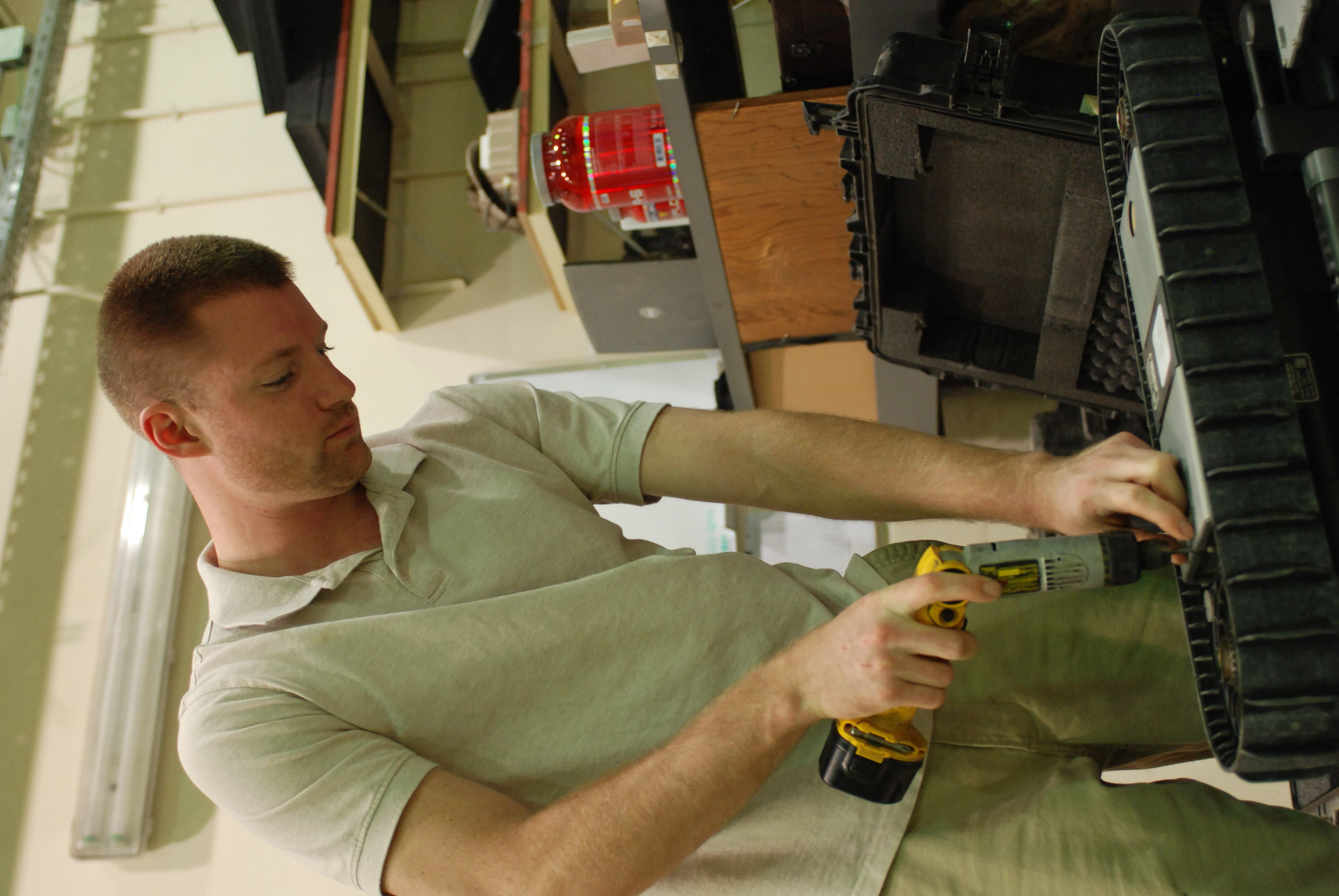
A US armed forces robot technician repairing the tread of a mine disposal robot

Automation technicians repair and maintain the computer-controlled systems and robotic devices used within industrial and commercial facilities to reduce human intervention and maximize efficiency. Their duties require knowledge of electronics, mechanics and computers. Automation technicians perform routine diagnostic checks on automated systems, monitor automated systems, isolate problems and perform repairs. If a problem occurs, the technician needs to be able to troubleshoot the issue and determine if the problem is mechanical, electrical or from the computer systems controlling the process. Once the issue has been diagnosed, the technician must repair or replace any necessary components, such as a sensor or electrical wiring. In addition to troubleshooting, Automation technicians design and service control systems ranging from electromechanical devices and systems to high-speed robotics and programmable logic controllers (PLCs). These types of systems include robotic assembly devices, conveyors, batch mixers, electrical distribution systems, and building automation systems. These machines and systems are often found within industrial and manufacturing plants, such as food processing facilities. Alternate job titles include field technician, bench technician, robotics technician, PLC technician, production support technician and maintenance technician.

== Education and training ==
Automation technician programs integrate computer programming with mechanics, electronics and process controls, They also commonly include coursework in hydraulics, pneumatics, programmable logic controllers, electrical circuits, electrical machinery and human-machine interfaces. Typical courses include math, communications, circuits, digital devices and electrical controls. Other courses include robotics, automation, electrical motor controls, programmable logic controllers, and computer-aided design. Good math and analytic skills are essential to understand automated systems and isolate problems. In addition to programming, Automation Technicians are expected to become proficient with various instruments and hand tools for troubleshooting, such as electrical multimeters, signal analyzers, and frequency counters.

Employers generally prefer applicants who have completed an automation technician certificate or associate degree. These programs can be completed at colleges and universities in either an in-class or online format. Some colleges, such as George Brown College, offer an online automation technician program that uses simulation software, LogixSim, to complete automation lab projects and assignments.

Other relevant credentials to become an automation technician include mechatronics, robotics, and PLCs. Up-to-date credentials and certifications can enhance employment opportunities and keep technicians current with the latest technological developments. In addition to colleges and universities, other organizations and companies also offer credential programs in automation, including equipment manufacturers such as Rockwell and professional associations, such as the Electronics Technicians Association, Robotics Industries Association and the Manufacturing Skill Standards Council.

== Career prospects ==
Career opportunities for automation technicians include a wide range of manufacturing and service industries such as automotive, pharmaceutical, power distribution, food processing, mining, and transportation. Other career prospects include areas as machine assembly, troubleshooting and testing, systems integration, application support, maintenance, component testing and assembly, automation programming, robot maintenance and programming, technical sales and services.

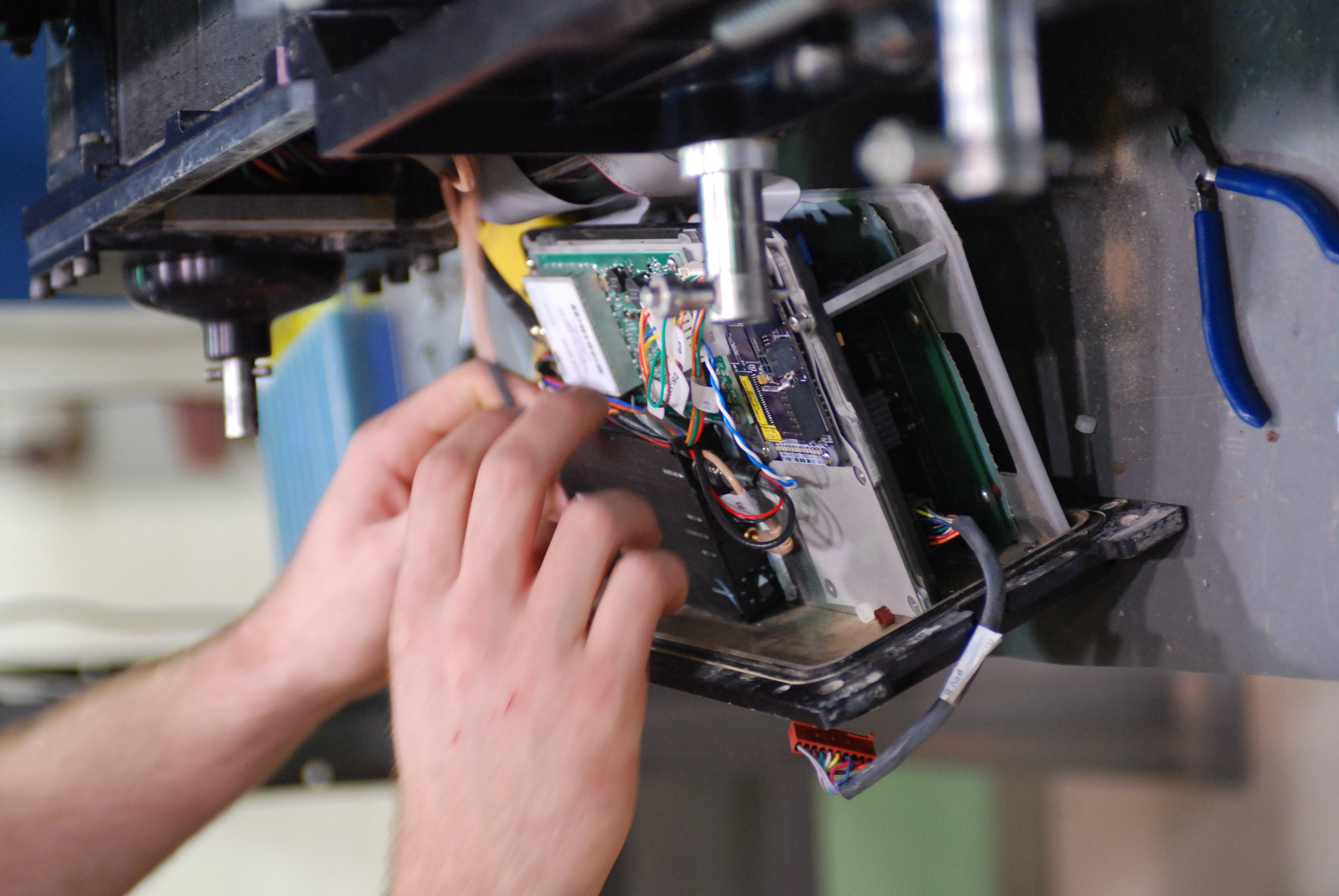
A US armed forces robotics repair technician working on a mine-clearing robot

Typical job-related activities may involve:

- assembly
- installation
- maintenance
- testing
- troubleshooting
- repair
- upgrading of associated automation equipment and systems.

Experienced automation technicians with advanced training may become specialists or troubleshooters who help other technicians diagnose difficult problems, or work with engineers in designing equipment and developing maintenance procedures. Automation technicians with leadership ability also may eventually become maintenance supervisors or service managers. Due to the highly specialized skills and knowledge required, there are many opportunities available to automation technicians in the service sector where there is a great demand for contract and sub-contract work with smaller manufacturing and distribution companies. Some experienced automation technicians open their own design, installation and maintenance companies. They can also become wholesalers or retailers of automation equipment, including inside and outside sales of automation equipment and systems.

Because of their familiarity with control systems and equipment, automation technicians are particularly well qualified to become manufacturers' sales representatives. Other related opportunities include customer service, quality-control, quality-assurance and consulting.

== See also ==
- Artificial intelligence
- Automation
- Industrial control system
- Robotics
