= Ironies of Automation =

1983 research paper

"Ironies of Automation" is a research paper written by Lisanne Bainbridge and published in Automatica in 1983, and has been widely recognized as a pioneering statement of the problems inherent in automation.

Bainbridge argues that new, severe problems are caused by automating most of the work, while the human operator is responsible for tasks that can not be automated. Thus, operators will not practice skills as part of their ongoing work. Their work now also includes exhausting monitoring tasks. Thus, rather than needing less training, operators need to be trained more to be ready for the rare but crucial interventions.

Barry Strauch analyzes the paper's significance, observing that by November 2016 it had attracted 1800 citations, far beyond other influential works on the topic, and that "The number of citations of Bainbridge’s work, large as it is, is also increasing at a considerable rate." Retrospectives on "Ironies of Automation" and its significance have appeared in both IEEE and ACM publications.

== Author ==
Lisanne Bainbridge is a cognitive psychologist, active in human factors research between the late 1960s and 1998. She obtained a doctorate in 1972 for work on process controllers and went on to author various research on mental load, process operations, and related topics. She taught at University of Reading and University College London.

== See also ==
- Doyle's catch
