= Constellation diagram =

Signal representation

An 8-PSK. Information transmitted according to the scheme described in the above diagram is encoded as one of 8 "symbols", each representing 3 bits of data. Each symbol is encoded as a different phase shift of the carrier sine wave: 0°, 45°, 90°, 135°, 180°, 225°, 270°, 315°.

A constellation diagram is a representation of a signal modulated by a digital modulation scheme such as quadrature amplitude modulation or phase-shift keying. It displays the signal as a two-dimensional xy-plane scatter diagram in the complex plane at symbol sampling instants. In a manner similar to that of a phasor diagram, the angle of a point, measured counterclockwise from the horizontal axis, represents the phase shift of the carrier wave from a reference phase; the distance of a point from the origin represents a measure of the amplitude or power of the signal. It could be considered a heat map of I/Q data.

In a digital modulation system, information is transmitted as a series of samples, each occupying a uniform time slot. During each sample, the carrier wave has a constant amplitude and phase, which is restricted to one of a finite number of values. So each sample encodes one of a finite number of "symbols", which in turn represent one or more binary digits (bits) of information. Each symbol is encoded as a different combination of amplitude and phase of the carrier, so each symbol is represented by a point on the constellation diagram, called a constellation point. The constellation diagram shows all the possible symbols that can be transmitted by the system as a collection of points. In a frequency or phase modulated signal, the signal amplitude is constant, so the points lie on a circle around the origin.

The carrier representing each symbol can be created by adding together different amounts of a cosine wave representing the "I" or in-phase carrier, and a sine wave, shifted by 90° from the I carrier called the "Q" or quadrature carrier. Thus each symbol can be represented by a complex number, and the constellation diagram can be regarded as a complex plane, with the horizontal real axis representing the I component and the vertical imaginary axis representing the Q component. A coherent detector is able to independently demodulate these carriers. This principle of using two independently modulated carriers is the foundation of quadrature modulation. In pure phase modulation, the phase of the modulating symbol is the phase of the carrier itself and this is the best representation of the modulated signal.

A 'signal space diagram' is an ideal constellation diagram showing the correct position of the point representing each symbol. After passing through a communication channel, due to electronic noise or distortion added to the signal, the amplitude and phase received by the demodulator may differ from the correct value for the symbol. When plotted on a constellation diagram the point representing that received sample will be offset from the correct position for that symbol. An electronic test instrument called a vector signal analyzer can display the constellation diagram of a digital signal by sampling the signal and plotting each received symbol as a point. The result is a 'ball' or 'cloud' of points surrounding each symbol position. Measured constellation diagrams can be used to recognize the type of interference and distortion in a signal.

== Interpretation ==
A constellation diagram for rectangular 16-QAM

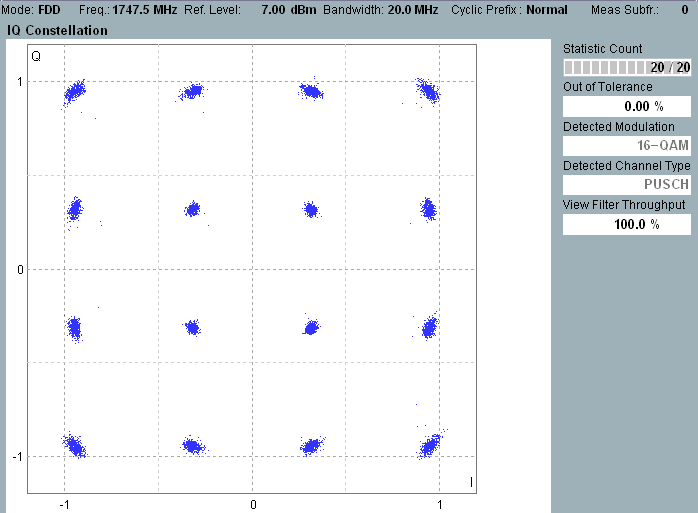
The constellation as received, with noise added

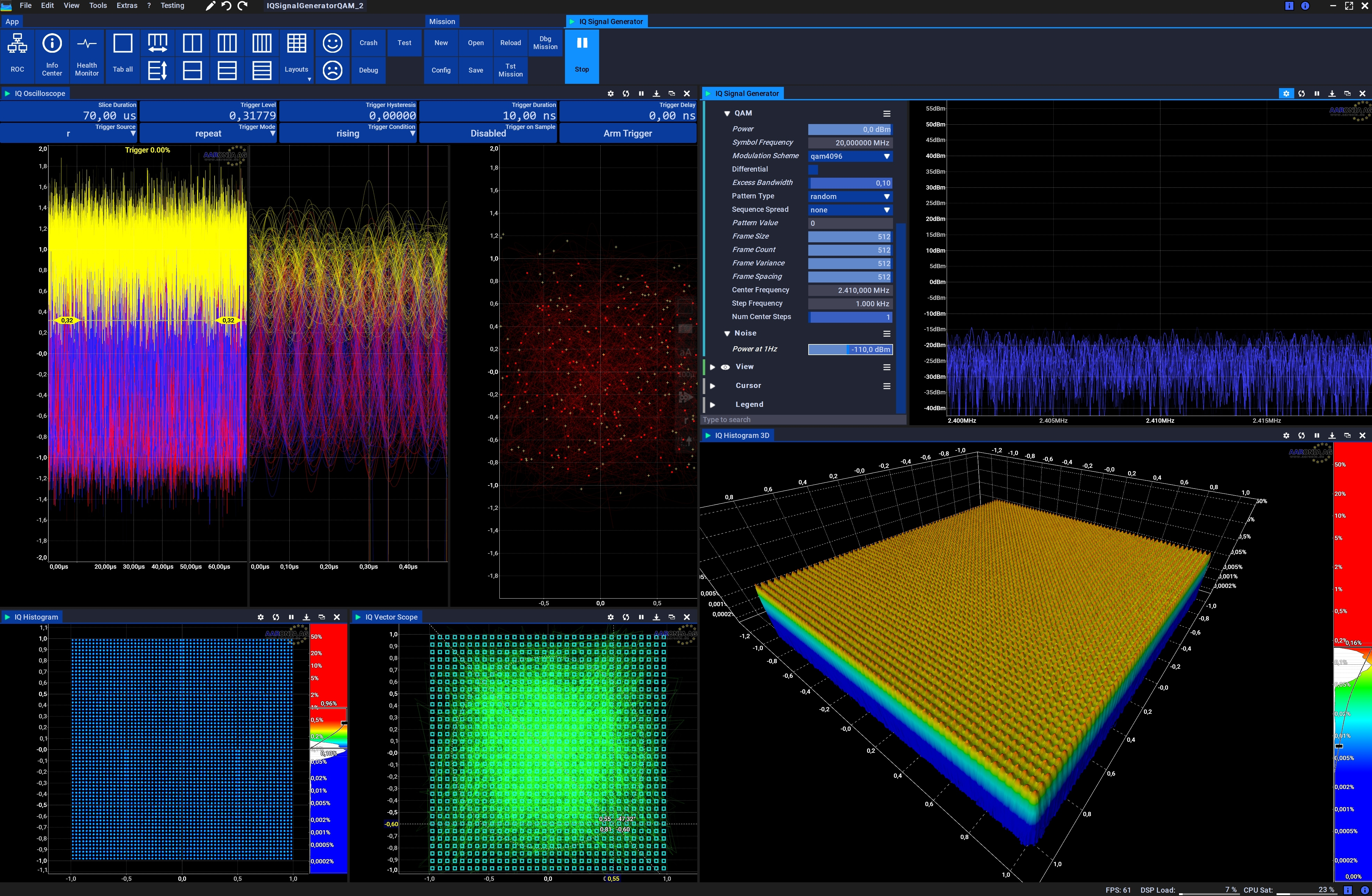
Spectrum analyzer software using different views to show a QAM 4096 constellation diagram

The number of constellation points in a diagram gives the size of the "alphabet" of symbols that can be transmitted by each sample, and so determines the number of bits transmitted per sample. It is usually a power of 2. A diagram with four points, for example, represents a modulation scheme that can separately encode all 4 combinations of two bits: 00, 01, 10, and 11, and so can transmit two bits per symbol. Thus in general a modulation with $N$ constellation points transmits $\log_2 N$ bits per symbol.

After passing through the communication channel the signal is decoded by a demodulator. The function of the demodulator is to classify each sample as a symbol. The set of sample values which the demodulator classifies as a given symbol can be represented by a region in the plane drawn around each constellation point. If noise causes the point representing a sample to stray into the region representing another symbol, the demodulator will misidentify that sample as the other symbol, resulting in a symbol error. Most demodulators choose, as its estimate of what was actually transmitted, the constellation point which is closest (in a Euclidean distance sense) to that of the received sample; this is called maximum likelihood detection. On the constellation diagram these detection regions can be easily represented by dividing the plane by lines equidistant from each adjacent pair of points.

One half the distance between each pair of neighboring points is the amplitude of additive noise or distortion required to cause one of the points to be misidentified as the other, and thus cause a symbol error. Therefore, the further the points are separated from one another, the greater the noise immunity of the modulation. Practical modulation systems are designed to maximize the minimum noise needed to cause a symbol error; on the constellation diagram this means that the distance between each pair of adjacent points is equal.

The received signal quality can be analyzed by displaying the constellation diagram of the signal at the receiver on a vector signal analyzer. Some types of distortion show up as characteristic patterns on the diagram:

- Gaussian noise causes the samples to land in a random ball about each constellation point
- Non-coherent single frequency interference shows as samples making circles about each constellation point
- Phase noise shows as constellation points spreading into arcs centered on the origin
- Amplifier compression causes the corner points to move towards the center

A constellation diagram visualises phenomena similar to those an eye pattern does for one-dimensional signals. The eye pattern can be used to see timing jitter in one dimension of modulation.

== See also ==
- Error vector magnitude
- Eye diagram
- Modulation error ratio
- Quadrature amplitude modulation
