= Automation engineering =

Branch of engineering dealing with automated solutions to physical activities

Automation engineering is a branch of engineering that deals with the development of methods and facilities of automation that replace, in whole or in part, manual labour related to the control and monitoring of systems and processes.

== Automation engineer ==
Automation engineers are experts who have the knowledge and ability to design, create, develop and manage machines and systems, for example, factory automation, process automation and warehouse automation. Automation technicians are also involved.

== Scope ==
Automation engineering is the integration of standard engineering fields. Automatic control of various control systems for operating various systems or machines to reduce human efforts & time to increase accuracy. Automation engineers design and service electromechanical devices and systems for high-speed robotics and programmable logic controllers (PLCs).

== Work and career after graduation ==
Graduates can work for both government and private sector entities such as industrial production, and companies that create and use automation systems, for example, the paper industry, automotive industry, metallurgical industry, food and agricultural industry, water treatment, and oil & gas sectors such as refineries, rolling mills, and power plants.

== Job description ==
Automation engineers can design, program, simulate and test automated machinery and processes, and are usually employed in industries such as the energy sector in plants, car manufacturing facilities, food processing plants, and robots. Automation engineers are responsible for creating detailed design specifications and other documents, developing automation based on specific requirements for the process involved, and conforming to international standards like IEC-61508, local standards, and other process-specific guidelines and specifications, simulating, testing, and commissioning electronic equipment for automation.

== See also ==
- Artificial intelligence
- Control engineering
- Mechatronics engineering
