= Error vector magnitude =

Performance measure of a digital radio

The error vector magnitude or EVM (sometimes also called relative constellation error or RCE) is a measure used to quantify the performance of a digital radio transmitter or receiver. A signal sent by an ideal transmitter or received by a receiver would have all constellation points precisely at the ideal locations, however various imperfections in the implementation (such as carrier leakage, low image rejection ratio, phase noise etc.) cause the actual constellation points to deviate from the ideal locations. Informally, EVM is a measure of how far the points are from the ideal locations.

Noise, distortion, spurious signals, and phase noise all degrade EVM, and therefore EVM provides a comprehensive measure of the quality of the radio receiver or transmitter for use in digital communications. Transmitter EVM can be measured by specialized equipment, which demodulates the received signal in a similar way to how a real radio demodulator does it. One of the stages in a typical phase-shift keying demodulation process produces a stream of I-Q points which can be used as a reasonably reliable estimate for the ideal transmitted signal in EVM calculation.

== Definition ==
Constellation diagram and EVM

An error vector is a vector in the I-Q plane between the ideal constellation point and the point received by the receiver. In other words, it is the difference between actual received symbols and ideal symbols. The root mean square (RMS) average amplitude of the error vector, normalized to ideal signal amplitude reference, is the EVM. EVM is generally expressed in percent by multiplying the ratio by 100.

The ideal signal amplitude reference can either be the maximum ideal signal amplitude of the constellation, or it can be the root mean square (RMS) average amplitude of all possible ideal signal amplitude values in the constellation. For many common constellations including BPSK, QPSK, and 8PSK, these two methods for finding the reference give the same result, but for higher-order QAM constellations including 16QAM, Star 32QAM, 32APSK, and 64QAM the RMS average and the maximum produce different reference values.

The error vector magnitude is sometimes expressed in dB. This is related to the value of EVM in percent as follows:
$$\mathrm{EVM}_\text{dB} = 20\log_{10} \left( {\mathrm{EVM}_\% \over 100} \right).$$

The definition of EVM depends heavily on the standard that is being used, for example in 3GPP LTE the relevant documents will define exactly how EVM is to be measured. There are discussions ongoing by academics as to some of the problems around EVM measurement.

== Dynamic EVM ==
Battery life and power consumption are important considerations for a system-level RF transmitter design. Because the transmit power amplifier (PA) consumes a significant portion of the total system DC power, a number of techniques are employed to reduce PA power usage. Many PAs offer an adjustable DC supply voltage to optimize the maximum RF output power level versus its DC power consumption. Also, most PAs can be powered-down or disabled when not in use to conserve power, such as while receiving or between packets during transmission. In order to maximize power efficiency, the PA must have fast turn-on and turn-off switching times. The highest DC power efficiency occurs when the time delta between PA Enable and the RF signal is minimized, but a short delay can exacerbate transient effects on the RF signal.

Because the power-up/power-down operation of the PA can cause transient and thermal effects that degrade transmitter performance, another metric called Dynamic EVM is often tested. Dynamic EVM is measured with a square wave pulse applied to PA Enable to emulate the actual dynamic operation conditions of the transmitter. The degradation in dynamic EVM is due to the PA transient response affecting the preamble at the start of the packet and causing an imperfect channel estimate. Studies have shown that dynamic EVM with a 50% duty cycle square wave applied to PA Enable to be worse than the static EVM (PA Enable with 100% duty cycle).

== See also ==
- Modulation error ratio
- Carrier to Noise Ratio
- Signal-to-noise ratio
