= Cam timer =

Electromechanical system for controlling events

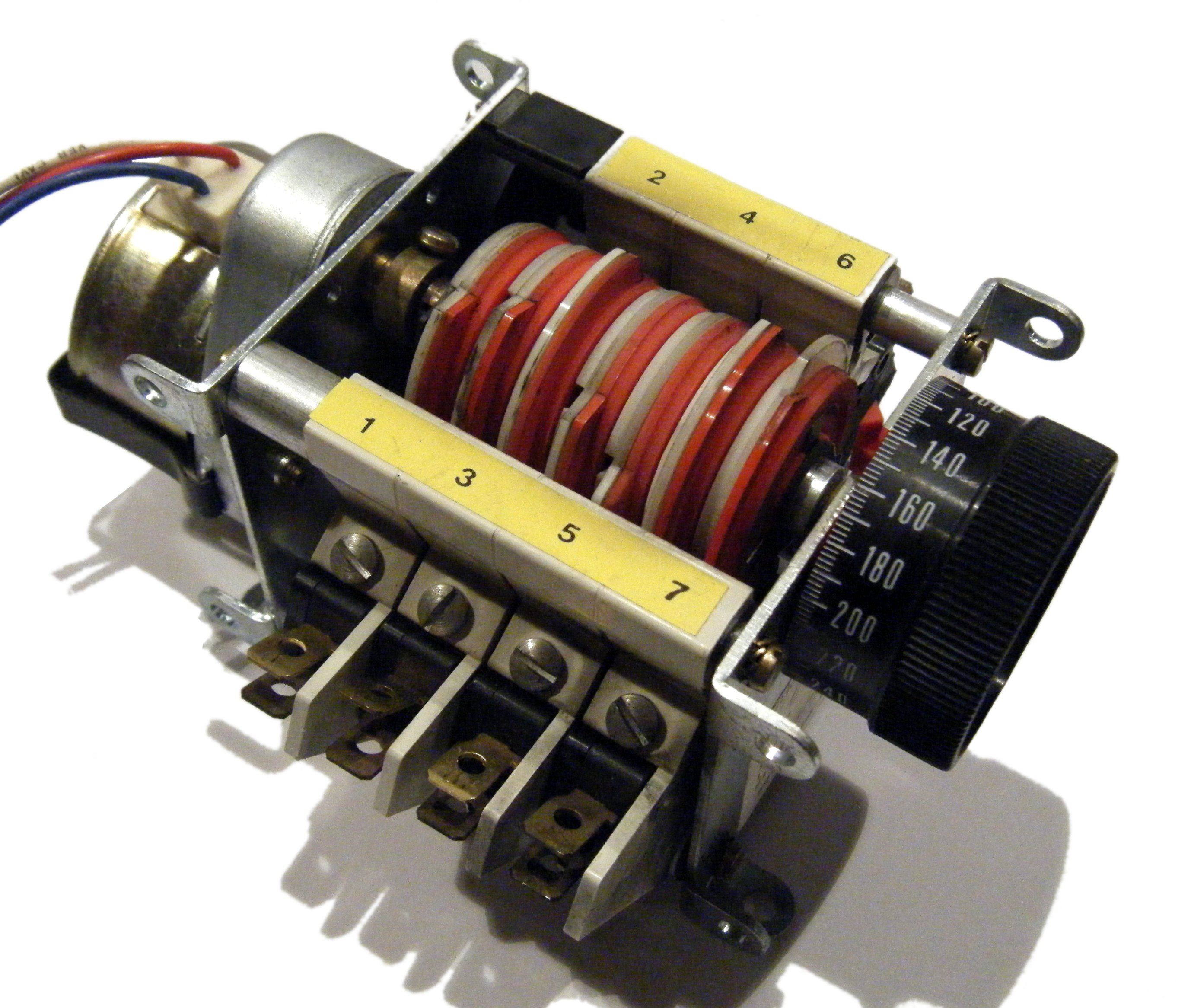
A 7 cam 7 contact cam timer

A cam timer or drum sequencer is an electromechanical system for controlling a sequence of events automatically. It resembles a music box with movable pins, controlling electrical switches instead of musical notes.

== Description ==
An electric motor drives a shaft arranged with a series of cams or a drum studded with pegs along its surface. Associated with each cam is one or more switches. The motor rotates at a fixed speed, and the camshaft is driven through a speed-reducing gearbox at a convenient slow speed. Indentations or protrusions on the cams operate the switches at different times. Complex sequences of opening and closing switches can be made by the arrangement of the cams and switches. The switches then operate different elements of the controlled system - for example, motors, valves, etc.

A programmer may change or rearrange (reprogram) peg or cam positions. Much like the pegs in a music box cylinder activate the notes, in a drum sequencer, as the drum of the sequencer spins, the pegs run across switches, activating machine processes. The placement of the pegs along the length of the cylinder determines which switch will activate along the length of the drum. Where the peg lies along the circular circumference of the drum determines at what point the peg will activate the switch in the drum's spin. The drum performs repetitive switching operations by controlling the timing and sequence of switches.

Most cam timers use a miniature mains synchronous motor to rotate the mechanism at an accurate constant speed. Occasionally, more complex timers with two motors are seen.

A drum sequencer is a reprogrammable electromechanical timing device that activates electric switches in repetitive sequences. These sequencers were primarily used in industrial applications to enable automated manufacturing processes.

== Uses ==
Industrial machines use cam timers and drum sequencers to control repetitive sequencing operations. The cam followers often operated hydraulic valves. Cam timers in the industry were superseded by the introduction of programmable logic controllers (PLCs), which offer improved flexibility and more complicated control logic functions. In consumer products like washing machines, they were replaced with ASICs or microcontrollers.

The most common use for cam timers is in automatic washing machines, which drive the washing sequence according to a pre-programmed pattern. They are gradually being superseded by microprocessor-controlled systems, which have greater versatility and thus can more efficiently respond to various feedback.

Another example is the usage in electromechanical pinball machines, where the cam timer is also known as a 'Score Motor.'

== Methods used to increase control ==
The most basic cam timer rotates continually, which is inconvenient when waiting for events that occur at variable times.

With washing machine cam timers, it is necessary to wait a variable amount of time (for example, waiting for a tank of water to heat up to a preset temperature). To achieve this, the cam motor is subjected to control by one of its switches. The timer sequence switches the cam motor off, and the motor is started again by the signal from the thermostat when the required temperature is reached.

Usually, washing machine thermostats have fewer fixed temperature detection points than the number of wash temperatures used. For intermediate temperatures, the cam mechanism uses the stop and wait for the method to heat to the nearest temperature below the one desired, then uses only the fixed timing of the heating element to increase the water to the desired temperature.

Some cam timers also have a fast forward mode, where applying power to a point on the controller causes rapid advance of the mechanism. This is often seen on washing machine controllers. Rapid advance can be achieved by moving of gearing, which may be triggered by various means.

Using feedback, external time delay, and other sensory circuits, it is possible to build an electromechanical state machine using a cam timer. These are common in washing machines, where the cam timer runs in phases, but also stops and waits for external signals such as a fill level sensor, or a water heating temperature sensor.

== Replacement with electronic controllers ==
While still fairly popular, cam timers are mechanical and hence subject to wear and reliability problems. Their reliability record remains good, but there is always some failure rate with mechanical switch contacts.

Electronic controllers have largely replaced cam timers in most applications, primarily to reduce costs and also to maximize product features.

Cam timers don't offer the greater flexibility that CPU-based controllers provide. In addition to offering more wash program variations, a CPU-based washing machine controller can respond to malfunctions, automatically initiate test cycles, reducing manufacturing costs, and provide fault codes in the field, again reducing repair costs. It also provides feedback on real-world failure rates and causes. All of these reduce manufacturing and business costs.

== See also ==
- Clock
- Drum machine (electronic musical instrument)
- Timer
- Player Piano (with a looped tape)
- Category:Mechanical musical instruments – contains automatic playing musical instruments using pinned cylinders, etc.
- Pinball
