= Image response =

Performance measure in radio electronics

Graphs illustrating the problem of image response in a superheterodyne. The horizontal axes are frequency and the vertical axes are voltage. Without an adequate RF filter, any radio signal S2 (green) from the antenna at the image frequency $f_\text{IMAGE}$ is also heterodyned to the IF frequency $f_\text{IF}$ along with the desired radio signal S1 (blue) at $f_\text{RF}$, so they both pass through the IF filter (red). Thus S2 interferes with S1.

Image response (or more correctly, image response rejection ratio, or IMRR) is a measure of performance of a radio receiver that operates on the superheterodyne principle.

In such a radio receiver, a local oscillator (LO) is used to heterodyne or "beat" against the incoming radio frequency (RF), generating sum and difference frequencies. One of these will be at the intermediate frequency (IF), and will be selected and amplified. The radio receiver is responsive to any signal at its designed IF frequency, including unwanted signals. For example, with a LO tuned to 110 MHz, there are two incoming signal frequencies that can generate a 10 MHz IF frequency. A signal broadcast at 100 MHz (the wanted signal), and mixed with the 110 MHz LO will create the sum frequency of 210 MHz (ignored by the receiver), and the difference frequency at the desired 10 MHz. However, a signal broadcast at 120 MHz (the unwanted signal), and mixed with the 110 MHz LO will create a sum frequency of 230 MHz (ignored by the receiver), and the difference frequency also at 10 MHz. The signal at 120 MHz is called the image of the wanted signal at 100 MHz. The ability of the receiver to reject this image gives the image rejection ratio (IMRR) of the system.

== Image rejection ratio ==
The image rejection ratio, or image frequency rejection ratio, is the ratio of the intermediate-frequency (IF) signal level produced by the desired input frequency to that produced by the image frequency. The image rejection ratio is usually expressed in dB. When the image rejection ratio is measured, the input signal levels of the desired and image frequencies must be equal for the measurement to be meaningful.

IMRR is measured in dB, giving the ratio of the wanted to the unwanted signal to yield the same output from the receiver. In a good design, ratios of >60 dB are achievable. Note that IMRR is not a measurement of the performance of the IF stages or IF filtering (selectivity); the signal yields a perfectly valid IF frequency. Rather, it is the measure of the bandpass characteristics of the stages preceding the IF amplifier, which will consist of RF bandpass filters and usually an RF amplifier stage or two.

== Image rejection formulas ==
The Image Frequency Rejection Ratio (IRR) is characterized by its RF filter which can be determined on the basis of its relative response of a parallel tuned circuit.

$IRR = \sqrt{1+\rho^2Q^2}$

where,

$\rho=\frac{f_{IMAGE}}{f_{RF}}-\frac{f_{RF}}{f_{IMAGE}}$and Q is the quality factor.

The Image Rejection Ratio for a given value of gain imbalance $\gamma, (\epsilon=\gamma-1)$ and phase imbalance $\phi$ is determined by,

$IMRR = \frac{\gamma^2+1-2\gamma cos(\phi)}{\gamma^2+1+2\gamma cos(\phi)} \approx \frac {\epsilon^2+\phi^2}{4}$

== See also ==
- Image frequency
