= Cycle time variation =

Cycle time variation is a metric and philosophy for continuous improvement in business, aiming to reduce variations in the time it takes to produce successive units on a production line. The process supports organizations' application of lean manufacturing or lean production by eliminating wasteful expenditure of resources.

It is distinguished from some of the more common applications by its different focus of creating a structure for progressively reducing the sources of internal variation that leads to workaround and disruption causing these wastes to accumulate in the first place. Although it is often used as an indicator of lean progress, its use promotes a structured approach to reducing disruption that impacts efficiency, quality, and value.
