= ZN414 =

Single-chip AM radio integrated circuit

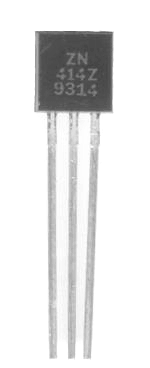
ZN414 in TO92 package

The ZN414 is a low cost, single-chip AM radio integrated circuit. Launched in 1972, the part was designed and supplied by Ferranti, but was second sourced from GEC-Plessey. The ZN414 was popular amongst hobbyists, as a fully working AM radio could be made with just a few external components, a crystal earpiece and a 1.5 V cell.

The original ZN414 chip from Ferranti was supplied in a 3-pin, metal TO-18 'transistor' package, whereas the GEC part and later Ferranti ones (ZN414Z) used the plastic TO-92 encapsulation. Later variants, the ZN415 and ZN416, came in 8-pin DIL packages and included a built-in amplifier that could drive headphones and small speakers directly.

The radio circuit inside the ZN414 is based on a design known as Tuned Radio Frequency (TRF). The TRF design is much simpler than the popular, but more complex, superheterodyne radio circuit often used in modern AM receivers. It is principally the use of the TRF circuit that allows almost a whole radio to be fitted into one small, three pin package.

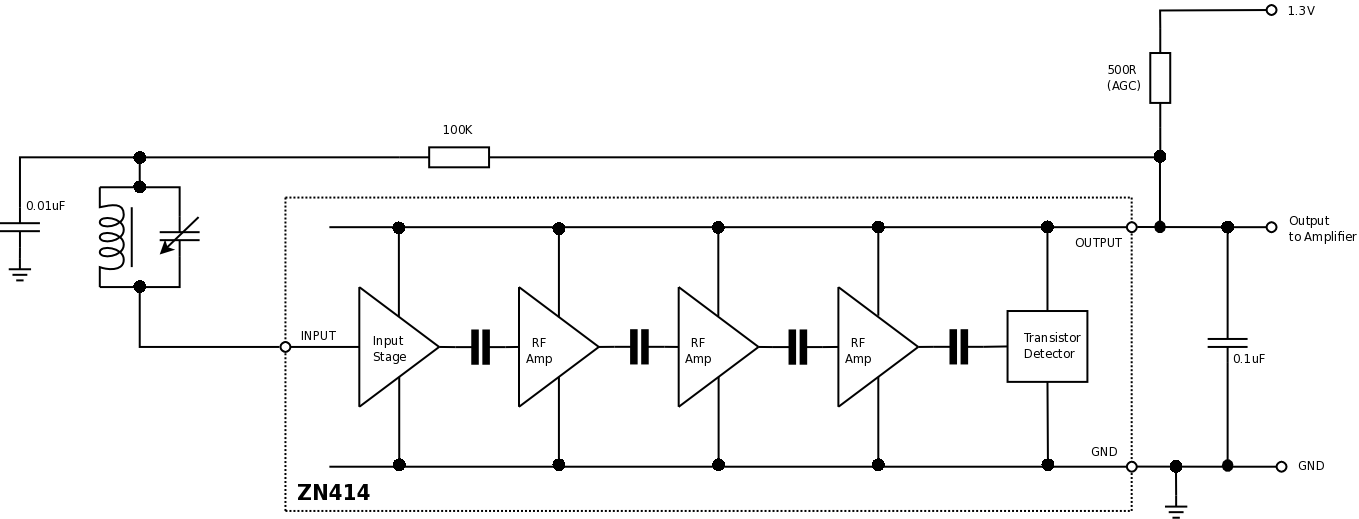
ZN414 in basic functional circuit

The manufacturing process for the ZN414 chip used a relatively new (for the time) technique known as Collector Diffusion Isolation (CDI). CDI was invented by engineers at Bell Telephone Laboratories and subsequently developed into a commercial process by Ferranti in the UK.

The original ZN41x family have not been manufactured for some time, but modern equivalents to the original 3-pin ZN414 are available, with part codes of MK484, TA7642 (different connections) and (mainly in India, the Far East & Australasia) YS414 and LMF501T. Note that on the YS414 part, pins 1 (output) and 3 (ground/earth) are transposed. Currently (2017) only the TA7642 is manufactured and is used in some AM/FM radios that use the 70 kHz IF single chip VHF-FM IC.

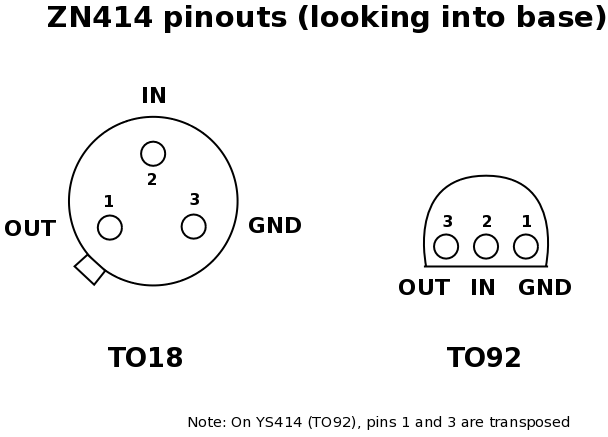
ZN414 pinouts

== Performance ==
The upper limit of operation is about 3 MHz, so it's not suitable for a shortwave radio. However, it can be used as an IF amp. The high input impedance means a valve (tube) radio IFT (IF transformer) is much more suitable than a ceramic filter or transistor IFT. Many designs using an SA612 as local oscillator / mixer and the ZN414 / TA7642 have been published on the Internet. AGC is applied by the resistor from the output to the "earthy" end of the input coil. Basic gain is set by the load resistor. The ZN414Z is designed for a single 1.5v cell usage, with a supply voltage of 1.1V-1.6V driving crystal or high impedance headphones or an audio amp. Current is dependent on load with 0.5mA maximum. As a result, a 1.8 V red LED (not the 2.2V high efficiency types) can be used in series as a voltage dropper from 3V batteries. Alternatively, for lower impedance 64ohm headphones, use the 415E or 416E variants, which still only take up to 5mA.
