= RF front end =

Radio receiver subsystem

Block diagram of a superheterodyne receiver. The RF front end consists of the components on the left, colored red.

In a radio receiver, the RF front end or radio frequency front end is the circuitry between the antenna input up to and including the mixer stage. It consists of all the components in the receiver that process the signal at the original incoming radio frequency (RF), before it is converted to a lower intermediate frequency (IF). In microwave and satellite receivers, it is often called the low-noise block downconverter (LNB) and is often located near the antenna, so that the RF from the antenna can be transferred to the rest of the receiver at the more easily handled IF.

== Superheterodyne receiver ==
For most superheterodyne architectures, the RF front end consists of:

- A band-pass filter (BPF) to reduce image response. This removes any signals at the image frequency, which would otherwise interfere with the desired signal. It also prevents strong out-of-band signals from saturating the input stages.
- An RF amplifier, often called the low-noise amplifier (LNA). Its primary responsibility is to increase the sensitivity of the receiver by amplifying weak signals without contaminating them with noise, so that they can stay above the noise level in succeeding stages. It must have a very low noise figure (NF). The RF amplifier may not be needed and is often omitted (or switched off) for frequencies below 30 MHz, where the signal-to-noise ratio is defined by atmospheric and human-made noise.
- A local oscillator (LO) which generates a radio frequency signal at an offset from the incoming signal, which is mixed with the incoming signal.
- The mixer, which mixes the incoming signal with the signal from the local oscillator to convert the signal to the intermediate frequency (IF).

== Digital receiver ==
In digital receivers, particularly those in wireless devices such as cell phones and Wifi receivers, the intermediate frequency is digitized; sampled and converted to a binary digital form, and the rest of the processing – IF filtering and demodulation – is done by digital filters (digital signal processing, DSP), as these are smaller, use less power and can have more selectivity. In this type of receiver, the RF front end is defined as everything from the antenna to the analog-to-digital converter (ADC), which digitizes the signal. The general trend is to do as much of the signal processing in digital form as possible, and some receivers digitize the RF signal directly, without down-conversion to an IF, so here the front end is merely an RF filter in the simple receiver path/chain.
