= R-350M =

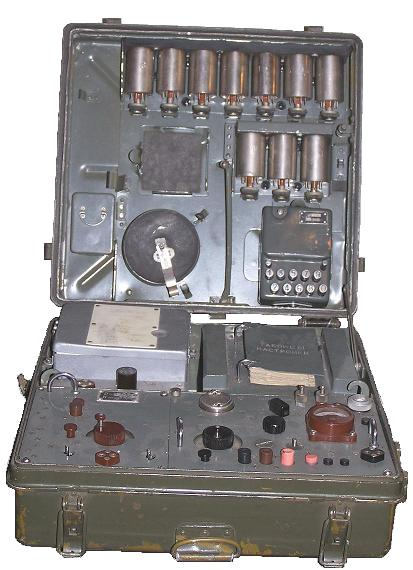
R-350M radio set

R-350M "Eagle" (Р-350M «Орел») is a Soviet portable short-wave radio transceiver designed for covert operations.

== Deployment ==
The R-350M radio was introduced in 1957 as a replacement for the earlier R-350 set. It was designed for use by Spetsnaz (special forces) involved in reconnaissance and sabotage missions behind enemy lines. The set could also be used by agents for espionage activities.

The main mode of operation of the R-350M was the so-called fast telegraph - it allowed for rapid transmission of a previously prepared message, making it near impossible to track the transmitter location. The radio operator would punch code the report on to standard 35mm photographic film using the tape perforator. The encoded film strip consisting of 5-digit digital groups was then fed into a hand cranked reader linked to the radio transmitter. The receipt of such a cipher-telegram was carried out using specialist equipment; a tape recording of the received signal would be played back at a much slower speed allowing the code to be de-crypted.

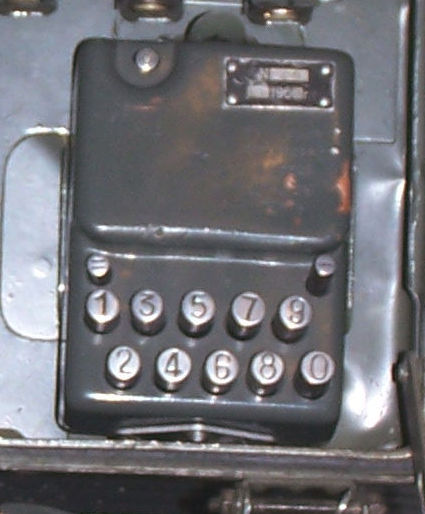
Tape perforator key pad unit

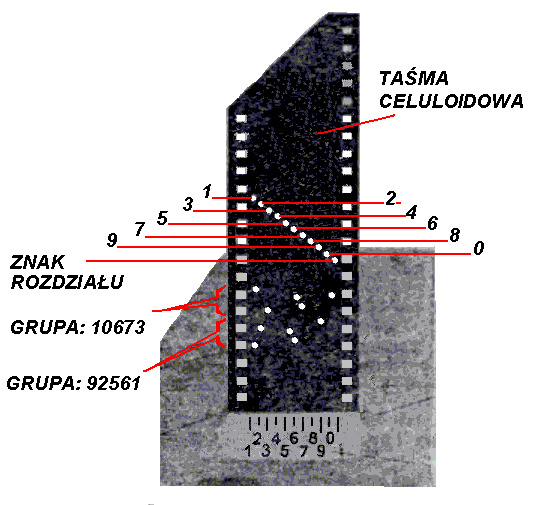
Illustration of the punch coding technique

== Technical specifications ==
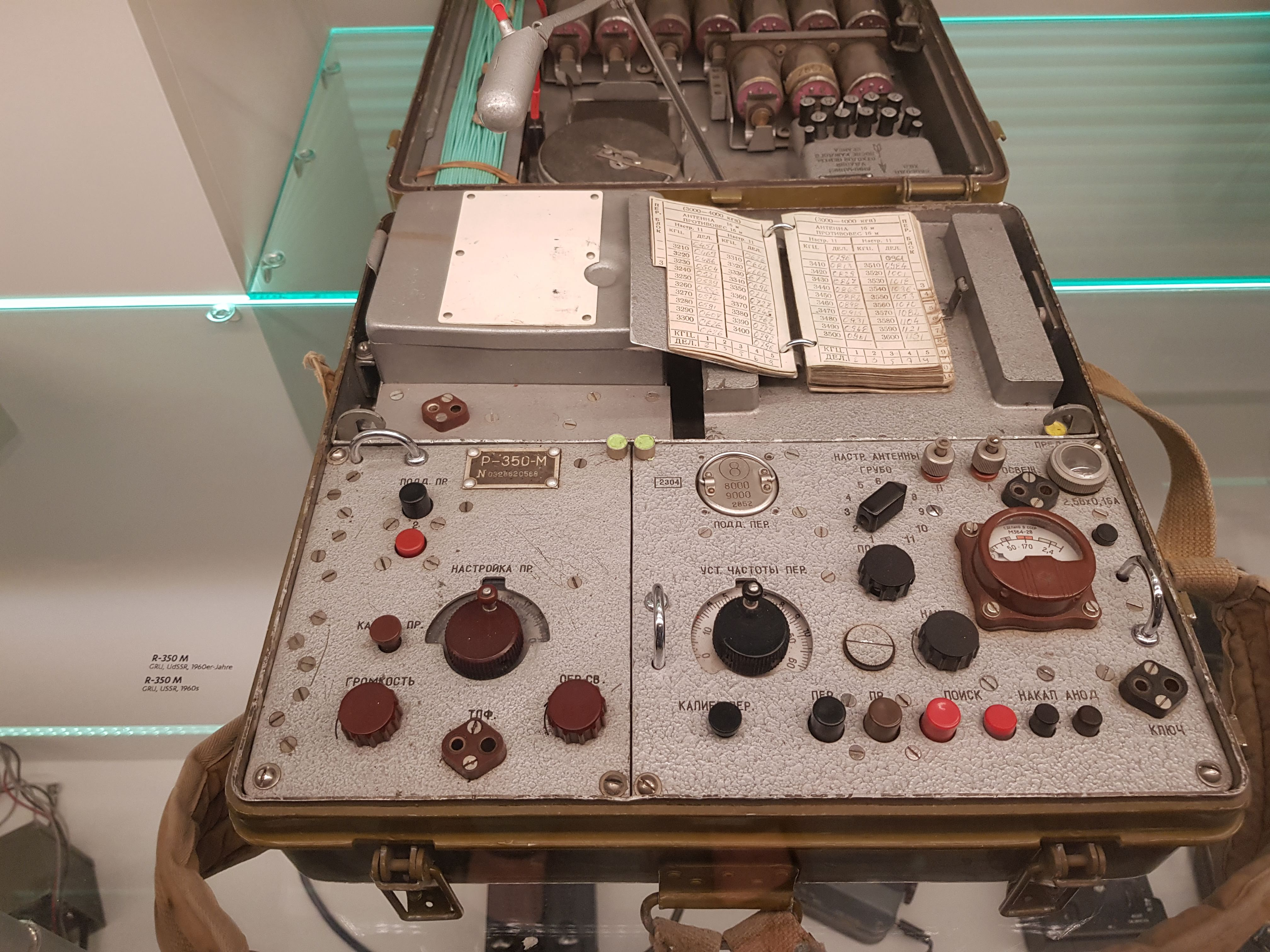
R-350M at Spy Museum, Berlin

- Amplitude modulation simplex radio transceiver
- Receiver section: Superheterodyne design with an intermediate frequency of 750 kHz, consisting of five miniature valves type 1Ж29Б
- Transmitter section: The circuit consists of five 1Ж29Б valves, and three 1П24Б parallel connected output valves
- Frequency range:
  - 1.8 - 12 MHz transmitter (in 11 sub-ranges selected by plug-in coils)
  - 1.8 - 7 MHz receiver (in 2 ranges)
- Transmitter output power: up to 6 W
- Receiver sensitivity:
  - For telephone work: ≤ 75 μV
  - For telegraphic work: ≤ 15 μV
- Power supply options:
  - 220 or 127 V 50 Hz mains (PZU power supply)
  - Hand generator (Э-348)
  - 4 СЦМ-5 batteries
  - Dry batteries 2 pcs. "B" -106B and "A" - 3B
- Weight of the radio: 12.8 kg
- Dimensions: 325 x 306 x 151 mm
- Radio antennas:
  - Radial antenna 26 m - with 5, 10 and 16 m connections
  - Counterweight 21 m - with 5, 10 and 15 m taps
- Range of the radio set:
  - On a ground wave of up to 50 km
  - On a reflected wave of 50 to 1000 km
- The radio consists of modular plug-in units housed in a robust splash-proof and dust-tight metal carry case; it was designed to work in temperatures from -40 °C to +50 °C and relative humidity up to 98%.
