= Rusty bolt effect =

Form of radio interference

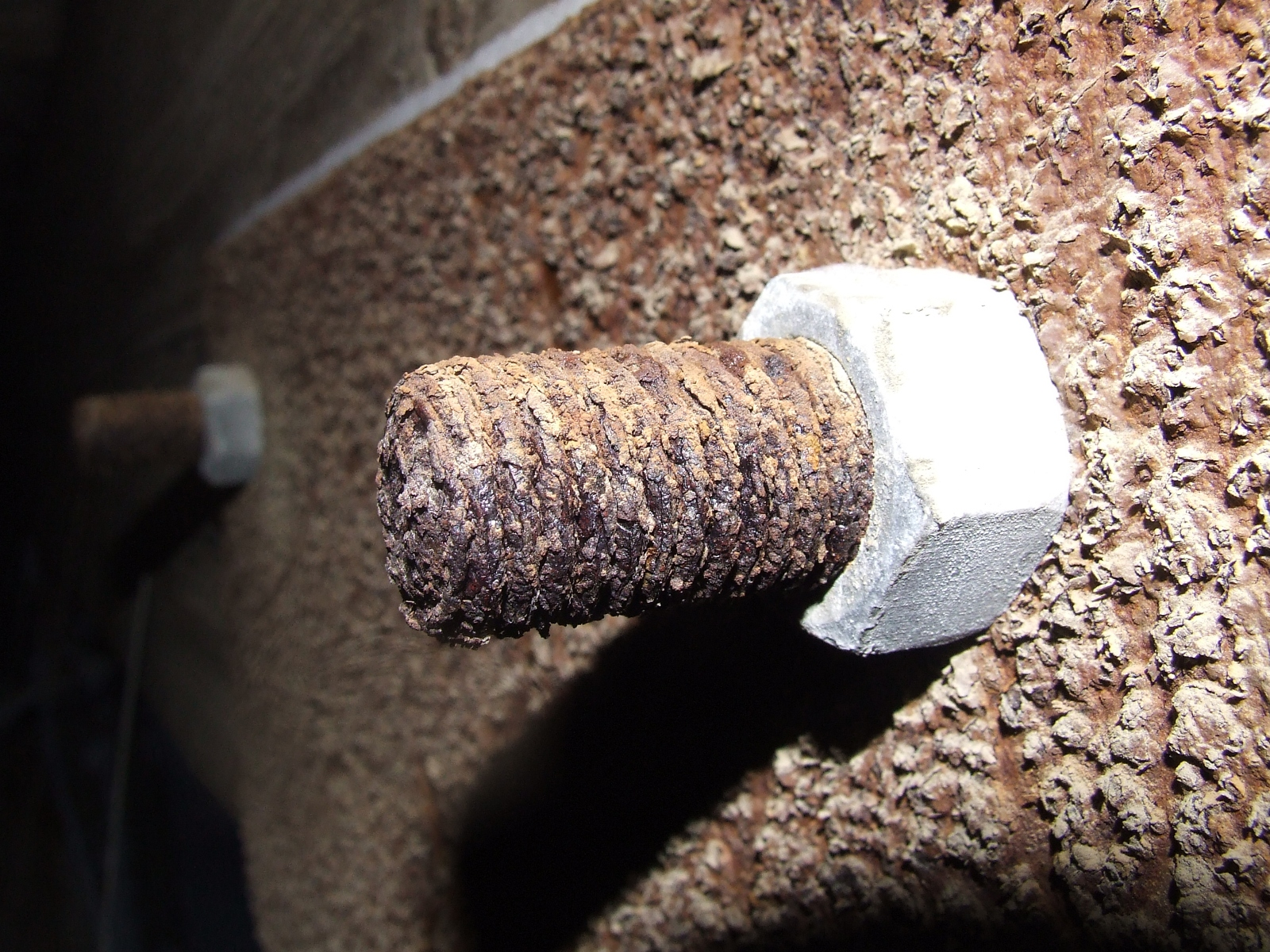
A rusty bolt in the structure of an antenna may create radio interference, even if it is not in the direct electrical pathway.

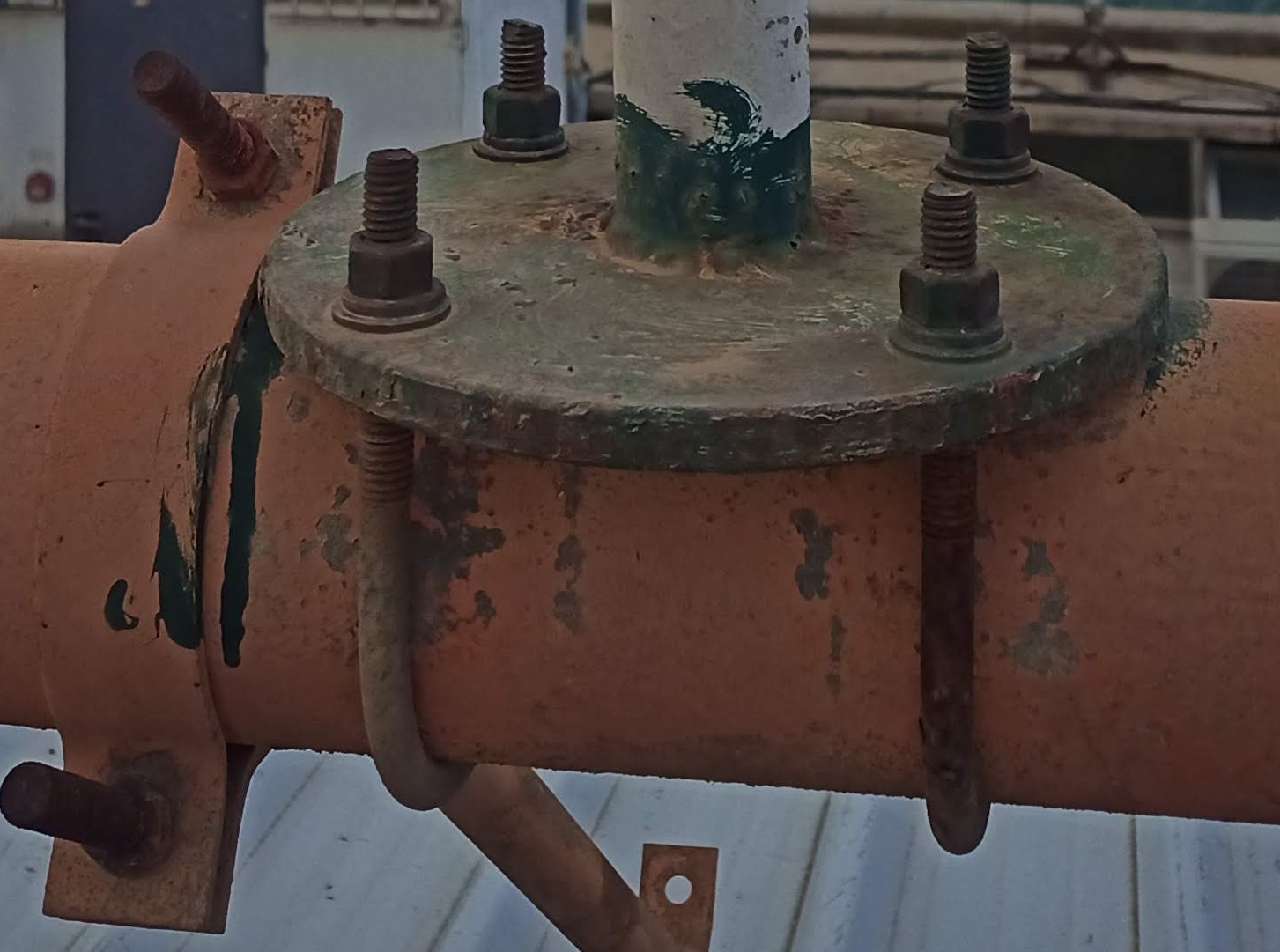
Close-up of a pipe flange showing bolts affected by rust in an outdoor environment.

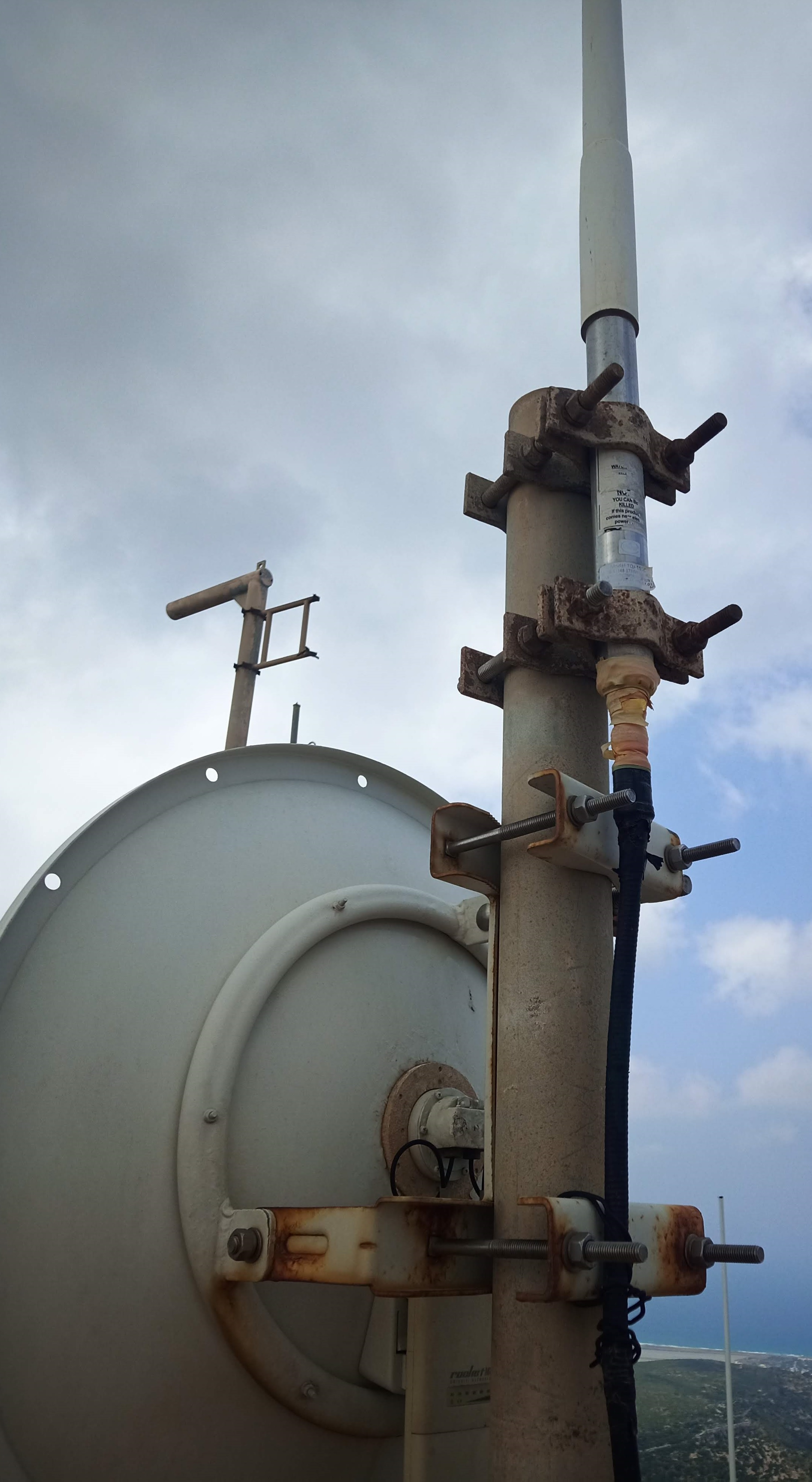
Rusty bolts and clamps on an antenna mount experiencing the rusty bolt effect.

The rusty bolt effect is a form of radio interference due to interactions of the radio waves with dirty connections or corroded parts. It is more properly known as passive intermodulation, and can result from a variety of different causes such as ferromagnetic conduction metals, or nonlinear microwave absorbers and loads. Corroded materials on antennas, waveguides, or even structural elements, can act as one or more diodes. (Crystal sets, early radio receivers, used the semiconductor properties of natural galena to demodulate the radio signal, and copper oxide was used in power rectifiers.) Galvanised fasteners and sheet roofing develop a coating of zinc oxide, a semiconductor commonly used for transient voltage suppression. This gives rise to undesired interference, including the generation of harmonics or intermodulation. Rusty objects that should not be in the signal-path, including antenna structures, can also reradiate radio signals with harmonics and other unwanted signals. As with all out-of-band noise, these spurious emissions can interfere with receivers.

This effect can cause radiated signals out of the desired band, even if the signal into a passive antenna is carefully band-limited.

== Mathematics associated with the rusty bolt ==
The transfer characteristic of an object can be represented as a power series:

$$E_\text{out} = \sum_{n=1}^\infty {K_n E_\text{in}^n}$$

Or, taking only the first few terms (which are most relevant),

$$E_\text{out} = K_1 E_\text{in} + K_2 E_\text{in}^2 + K_3 E_\text{in}^3 + K_4 E_\text{in}^4 + K_5 E_\text{in}^5 + ...$$

For an ideal perfect linear object K_{2}, K_{3}, K_{4}, K_{5}, etc. are all zero. A good connection approximates this ideal case with sufficiently small values.

For a 'rusty bolt' (or an intentionally designed frequency mixer stage), K_{2}, K_{3}, K_{4}, K_{5}, etc. are not all zero. These higher-order terms result in generation of harmonics.

The following analysis applies the power series representation to an input sine-wave.

=== Harmonic generation ===
If the incoming signal is a sine wave {E_{in} sin(ωt)}, (and taking only first-order terms), then the output can be written:

$$\begin{align}
E_\text{out} &= \sum_{i = 1}^\infty {K_i E_\text{in}^i \sin(i \omega t)} \\
&= K_1 E_\text{in} \sin(\omega t) + K_2 E_\text{in}^2 \sin(2\omega t) + K_3 E_\text{in}^3 \sin(3\omega t) + K_4 E_\text{in}^4 \sin(4\omega t) + K_5 E_\text{in}^5 \sin(5\omega t) + \cdots
\end{align}$$

Clearly, the harmonic terms will be worse at high input signal amplitudes, as they increase exponentially with the amplitude of E_{in}.

=== Mixing product generation ===
==== Second order terms ====
To understand the generation of nonharmonic terms (frequency mixing), a more complete formulation must be used, including higher-order terms. These terms, if significant, give rise to intermodulation distortion.

$$\begin{align}
E_{f_1 + f_2} &= k E_{f_1} E_{f_2}\\
E_{f_1 - f_2} &= k E_{f_1} E_{f_2}
\end{align}$$

==== Third order terms ====
$$\begin{align}
E_{f_1 + f_2 + f_3} &= k E_{f_1} E_{f_2} E_{f_3} \\
E_{f_1 - f_2 + f_3} &= k E_{f_1} E_{f_2} E_{f_3} \\
E_{f_1 + f_2 - f_3} &= k E_{f_1} E_{f_2} E_{f_3} \\
E_{f_1 - f_2 - f_3} &= k E_{f_1} E_{f_2} E_{f_3}
\end{align}$$

Hence the second-order, third-order, and higher-order mixing products can be greatly reduced by lowering the intensity of the original signals (f_{1}, f_{2}, f_{3}, f_{4}, …, f_{n})
