= Homodyne detection =

Sensor implementation technique

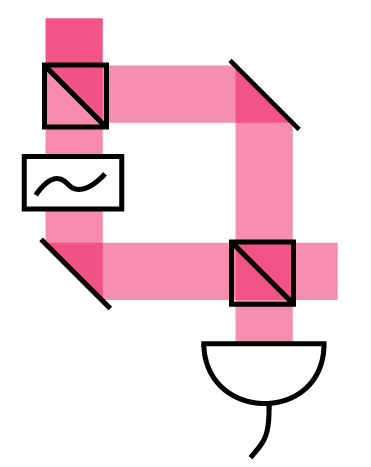
Optical homodyne detection

Homodyne detection is a method of extracting information encoded as modulation of the phase and/or frequency of an oscillating signal, by comparing that signal with a standard oscillation that would be identical to the signal if it carried null information. "Homodyne" signifies a single frequency, in contrast to the dual frequencies employed in heterodyne detection.

== Optics ==
In optical interferometry, homodyne signifies that the reference radiation (i.e. the local oscillator) is derived from the same source as the signal before the modulating process. For example, in a laser scattering measurement, the laser beam is split into two parts. One is the local oscillator and the other is sent to the system to be probed. The scattered light is then mixed with the local oscillator on the detector. This arrangement has the advantage of being insensitive to fluctuations in the frequency of the laser. Usually the scattered beam will be weak, in which case the (nearly) steady component of the detector output is a good measure of the instantaneous local oscillator intensity and therefore can be used to compensate for any fluctuations in the intensity of the laser..

The generated current signal from the photodetector is often converted into a voltage using a transimpedance amplifier.

=== Quantum optics ===
In quantum optics, homodyne detection refers to the measurement of a signal beam's field quadratures by interference with a strong reference beam. This is achieved by aligning both beams onto a beam splitter and measuring the photon number difference in both of its output ports. If $\phi$ is the phase difference between the two beams this implements a measurement of the following observable:

$$\mathbf{A}(\phi) = \cos (\phi) \hat{\mathbf{X}} + \sin (\phi) \hat{\mathbf{P}}$$

Where $\hat{\mathbf{X}},\hat{\mathbf{P}}$ are the in-phase and quadrature observables that represent real and imaginary parts of the states complex amplitude. For $\phi \in [0,\pi)$ these operators form a tomographically complete set and can be used in quantum state tomography.

== Radio technology ==
In radio technology, the distinction is not the source of the local oscillator, but the frequency used. In heterodyne detection, the local oscillator is frequency-shifted, while in homodyne detection it has the same frequency as the radiation to be detected. See direct conversion receiver.

== Applications ==
Lock-in amplifiers are homodyne detectors integrated into measurement equipment or packaged as stand-alone laboratory equipment for sensitive detection and highly selective filtering of weak or noisy signals. Homodyne/lock-in detection has been one of the most commonly used signal processing methods across a wide range of experimental disciplines for decades.

Homodyne and heterodyne techniques are commonly used in thermoreflectance techniques.

In the processing of signals in some applications of magnetic resonance imaging, homodyne detection can offer advantages over magnitude detection. The homodyne technique can suppress excessive noise and undesired quadrature components (90° out-of-phase), and provide stable access to information that may be encoded into the phase or polarity of images.

Homodyne detection was one of the key techniques in demonstrating quantum entanglement. This has led to the possibility of providing a room temperature quantum sensor with continuous-variable quantum information. However, challenges include reducing noise, increasing bandwidth and improving the integration of electronic and photonic components. Recently, these challenges have been overcome to demonstrate a free-space-coupled room temperature quantum sensor with large-scale integrated photonics and electronics.

An encrypted secure communication system can be based on quantum key distribution (QKD). An efficient receiver scheme for implementing QKD is balanced homodyne detection (BHD) using a positive–intrinsic–negative (PIN) diode.

When applied to processing of the reflected signal in remote sensing for topography, homodyne detection lacks the ability of heterodyne detection to determine the size of a static discontinuity in elevation between two locations. (If there is a path between the two locations with smoothly changing elevation, then homodyne detection may in principle be able to track the signal phase along the path if sampling is dense enough). Homodyne detection is more readily applicable to velocity sensing.

== See also ==
- Heterodyne
- Optical heterodyne detection
