= Heterodyne =

Signal processing technique

Frequency mixer symbol used in schematic diagrams. Here, the input signal consists of signals at multiple frequencies, which are mixed to create the output signal that are signals at new frequencies.

A heterodyne is the result of mixing two signals in a nonlinear device to produce new frequency components, notably sum and difference frequencies of the original signals. This process, called heterodyning, is fundamental to signal processing and radio systems. The term originated with Reginald Fessenden, who in 1908 described a “heterodyne receiver” in which a locally generated oscillation interacts with the received signal to produce “beats of an audible frequency.” In that paper he also referred to his 1902 patent describing such a system, although the term heterodyne was not used there.

In a typical implementation, signals at frequencies f₁ and f₂ are applied to a nonlinear element such as a frequency mixer, producing components at f₁ + f₂ and f₁ − f₂, along with additional intermodulation products arising from the device nonlinearity. One of these components is selected by filtering for further use, while the others are rejected.

Heterodyning is not limited to radio frequencies; the same principle applies across the electromagnetic spectrum, including infrared and optical systems, where it is used in coherent detection techniques. Heterodyne frequencies are related to the phenomenon of beats in acoustics.

A major application of the heterodyne process is in the superheterodyne radio receiver circuit, which is used in virtually all modern radio receivers.

== History ==
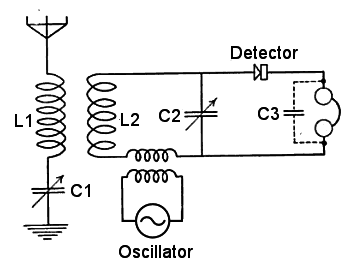
Fessenden's heterodyne radio receiver circuit. The incoming radio frequency and local oscillator frequency mix in the crystal diode detector.

In 1901, Reginald Fessenden demonstrated a direct-conversion receiver or beat receiver as a method of making continuous wave radiotelegraphy signals audible. Fessenden's receiver did not see much application because of its local oscillator's stability problem. A stable yet inexpensive local oscillator was not available until Lee de Forest invented the triode vacuum tube oscillator. In a 1905 patent, Fessenden stated that the frequency stability of his local oscillator was one part per thousand.

In radio telegraphy, the characters of text messages are translated into the short duration dots and long duration dashes of Morse code that are broadcast as radio signals. Radio telegraphy was much like ordinary telegraphy. One of the problems was building high power transmitters with the technology of the day. Early transmitters were spark gap transmitters. A mechanical device would make sparks at a fixed but audible rate; the sparks would put energy into a resonant circuit that would then ring at the desired transmission frequency (which might be 100 kHz). This ringing would quickly decay, so the output of the transmitter would be a succession of damped waves. When these damped waves were received by a simple detector, the operator would hear an audible buzzing sound that could be transcribed back into alpha-numeric characters.

With the development of the arc converter radio transmitter in 1904, continuous wave (CW) modulation began to be used for radiotelegraphy. CW Morse code signals are not amplitude modulated, but rather consist of bursts of sinusoidal carrier frequency. When CW signals are received by an AM receiver, the operator does not hear a sound. The direct-conversion (heterodyne) detector was invented to make continuous wave radio-frequency signals audible.

The heterodyne or beat receiver has a local oscillator that produces a radio signal adjusted to be close in frequency to the incoming signal being received. When the two signals are mixed, a beat frequency equal to the difference between the two frequencies is created. Adjusting the local oscillator frequency correctly puts the beat frequency in the audio range, where it can be heard as a tone in the receiver's earphones whenever the transmitter signal is present. Thus the Morse code dots and dashes are audible as beeping sounds. This technique is still used in radio telegraphy, the local oscillator now being called the beat frequency oscillator or BFO. Fessenden coined the word heterodyne from the Greek roots hetero-, different, and dyn-, power (cf. δύναμις or dunamis).

=== Superheterodyne receiver ===
Block diagram of a typical superheterodyne receiver. Red parts handle the incoming radio frequency (RF) signal; green parts operate at the intermediate frequency (IF), while blue parts operate at the modulation (audio) frequency.

An important and widely used application of the heterodyne technique is in the superheterodyne receiver (superhet). In the typical superhet, the incoming radio frequency signal from the antenna is mixed (heterodyned) with a signal from a local oscillator (LO) to produce a lower fixed frequency signal called the intermediate frequency (IF) signal. The IF signal is amplified and filtered and then applied to a detector that extracts the audio signal; the audio is ultimately sent to the receiver's loudspeaker.

The superheterodyne receiver has several advantages over previous receiver designs. One advantage is easier tuning; only the RF filter and the LO are tuned by the operator; the fixed-frequency IF is tuned ("aligned") at the factory and is not adjusted. In older designs such as the tuned radio frequency receiver (TRF), all of the receiver stages had to be simultaneously tuned. In addition, since the IF filters are fixed-tuned, the receiver's selectivity is the same across the receiver's entire frequency band. Another advantage is that the IF signal can be at a much lower frequency than the incoming radio signal, and that allows each stage of the IF amplifier to provide more gain. To first order, an amplifying device has a fixed gain-bandwidth product. If the device has a gain-bandwidth product of 60 MHz, then it can provide a voltage gain of 3 at an RF of 20 MHz or a voltage gain of 30 at an IF of 2 MHz. At a lower IF, it would take fewer gain devices to achieve the same gain. The regenerative radio receiver obtained more gain out of one gain device by using positive feedback, but it required careful adjustment by the operator; that adjustment also changed the selectivity of the regenerative receiver. The superheterodyne provides a large, stable gain and constant selectivity without troublesome adjustment.

The superior superheterodyne system replaced the earlier TRF and regenerative receiver designs, and since the 1930s most commercial radio receivers have been superheterodynes.

== Applications ==
Heterodyning, also called frequency conversion, is used very widely in communications engineering to generate new frequencies and move information from one frequency channel to another. Besides its use in the superheterodyne circuit found in almost all radio and television receivers, it is used in radio transmitters, modems, satellite communications and set-top boxes, radar, radio telescopes, telemetry systems, cell phones, cable television converter boxes and headends, microwave relays, metal detectors, atomic clocks, and military electronic countermeasure (jamming) systems.

=== Up and down converters ===
In large scale telecommunication networks such as telephone network trunks, microwave relay networks, cable television systems, and communication satellite links, large bandwidth capacity links are shared by many individual communication channels by using heterodyning to move the frequency of the individual signals up to different frequencies, which share the channel. This is called frequency division multiplexing (FDM).

For example, a coaxial cable used by a cable television system can carry 500 television channels at the same time because each one is given a different frequency, so they do not interfere with one another. At the cable source or headend, electronic upconverters convert each incoming television channel to a new, higher frequency. They do this by mixing the television signal frequency, f_{CH} with a local oscillator at a much higher frequency f_{LO}, creating a heterodyne at the sum f_{CH} + f_{LO}, which is added to the cable. At the consumer's home, the cable set top box has a downconverter that mixes the incoming signal at frequency f_{CH} + f_{LO} with the same local oscillator frequency f_{LO} creating the difference heterodyne frequency, converting the television channel back to its original frequency: (f_{CH} + f_{LO}) − f_{LO} = f_{CH}. Each channel is moved to a different higher frequency. The original lower basic frequency of the signal is called the baseband, while the higher channel it is moved to is called the passband.

=== Analog videotape recording ===
Many analog videotape systems rely on a downconverted color subcarrier to record color information in their limited bandwidth. These systems are referred to as heterodyne systems or color-under systems. For instance, for NTSC video systems, the VHS (and S-VHS) recording system converts the color subcarrier from the NTSC standard 3.58 MHz to ~629 kHz. PAL VHS color subcarrier is similarly downconverted (but from 4.43 MHz). The now-obsolete 3/4" U-matic systems use a heterodyned ~688 kHz subcarrier for NTSC recordings (as does Sony's Betamax, which is at its basis a 1/2″ consumer version of U-matic), while PAL U-matic decks came in two mutually incompatible varieties, with different subcarrier frequencies, known as Hi-Band and Low-Band. Other videotape formats with heterodyne color systems include Video-8 and Hi8.

The heterodyne system in these cases is used to convert quadrature phase-encoded and amplitude modulated sine waves from the broadcast frequencies to frequencies recordable in less than 1 MHz bandwidth. On playback, the recorded color information is heterodyned back to the standard subcarrier frequencies for display on televisions and for interchange with other standard video equipment.

Some U-matic (3/4″) decks feature 7-pin mini-DIN connectors to allow dubbing of tapes without conversion, as do some industrial VHS, S-VHS, and Hi8 recorders.

=== Music synthesis ===
The theremin, an electronic musical instrument, traditionally uses the heterodyne principle to produce a variable audio frequency in response to the movement of the musician's hands in the vicinity of one or more antennas, which act as capacitor plates. The output of a fixed radio frequency oscillator is mixed with that of an oscillator whose frequency is affected by the variable capacitance between the antenna and the musician's hand as it is moved near the pitch control antenna. The difference between the two oscillator frequencies produces a tone in the audio range.

The ring modulator is a type of frequency mixer incorporated into some synthesizers or used as a stand-alone audio effect.

=== Optical heterodyning ===
Optical heterodyne detection (an area of active research) is an extension of the heterodyning technique to higher (visible) frequencies. Guerra (1995) first published the results of what he called a "form of optical heterodyning" in which light patterned by a 50 nm pitch grating illuminated a second grating of pitch 50 nm, with the gratings rotated with respect to each other by the angular amount needed to achieve magnification. Although the illuminating wavelength was 650 nm, the 50 nm grating was easily resolved. This showed a nearly 5-fold improvement over the Abbe resolution limit of 232 nm that should have been the smallest obtained for the numerical aperture and wavelength used. This super-resolution microscopic imaging through optical heterodyning later came to be known by many as structured illumination microscopy.

In addition to super-resolution optical microscopy, optical heterodyning could greatly improve optical modulators, increasing the density of information carried by optical fibers. It is also being applied in the creation of more accurate atomic clocks based on directly measuring the frequency of a laser beam. (Note: See NIST subtopic 9.07.9-4.R for a description of research on one system to do this.)

Since optical frequencies are far beyond the manipulation capacity of any feasible electronic circuit, all visible frequency photon detectors are inherently energy detectors not oscillating electric field detectors. However, since energy detection is inherently square-law detection, it intrinsically mixes any optical frequencies present on the detector. Thus, sensitive detection of specific optical frequencies necessitates optical heterodyne detection, in which two different (close by) wavelengths of light illuminate the detector so that the oscillating electrical output corresponds to the difference between their frequencies. This allows extremely narrow band detection (much narrower than any possible color filter can achieve) as well as precision measurements of phase and frequency of a light signal relative to a reference light source, as in a laser Doppler vibrometer.

This phase sensitive detection has been applied for Doppler measurements of wind speed, and imaging through dense media. The high sensitivity against background light is especially useful for lidar.

In optical Kerr effect (OKE) spectroscopy, optical heterodyning of the OKE signal and a small part of the probe signal produces a mixed signal consisting of probe, heterodyne OKE-probe and homodyne OKE signal. The probe and homodyne OKE signals can be filtered out, leaving the heterodyne frequency signal for detection.

Heterodyne detection is often used in interferometry but usually confined to single point detection rather than widefield interferometry, however, widefield heterodyne interferometry is possible using a special camera. Using this technique which a reference signal extracted from a single pixel it is possible to build a highly stable widefield heterodyne interferometer by removing the piston phase component caused by microphonics or vibrations of the optical components or object.

== Mathematical principle ==
Heterodyning is based on the trigonometric identity:

$$(\cos\theta_1) (\cos\theta_2) = \tfrac{1}{2}\cos(\theta_1 - \theta_2) + \tfrac{1}{2}\cos( \theta_1 + \theta_2)$$

The product on the left hand side represents the multiplication ("mixing") of a sine wave with another sine wave (both produced by cosine functions). The right hand side shows that the resulting signal is the sum of two sinusoidal terms, one at the sum of the two original frequencies, and one at the difference, which can be dealt with separately, since their (large) frequency difference makes it easy to cleanly filter out one signal's frequency, while leaving the other signal unchanged.

Using this trigonometric identity, the result of multiplying two cosine wave signals $\ \cos\left(2 \pi f_1 t\right)\$ and $\ \cos\left(2 \pi f_2 t\right)\$ at different frequencies $\ f_1\$ and $\ f_2\$ can be calculated:

$$\cos(2 \pi f_1 t) \cos(2 \pi f_2 t) = \tfrac{1}{2}\cos[2 \pi ( f_1 - f_2) t ] + \tfrac{1}{2}\cos[ 2 \pi ( f_1 + f_2) t ]$$

The result is the sum of two sinusoidal signals, one at the sum f_{1} + f_{2} and one at the difference f_{1} − f_{2} of the original frequencies.

=== Mixer ===
The two signals are combined in a device called a mixer. As seen in the previous section, an ideal mixer would be a device that multiplies the two signals. Some widely used mixer circuits, such as the Gilbert cell, operate in this way, but they are limited to lower frequencies. However, any nonlinear electronic component also multiplies signals applied to it, producing heterodyne frequencies in its output—so a variety of nonlinear components serve as mixers. A nonlinear component is one in which the output current or voltage is a nonlinear function of its input. Most circuit elements in communications circuits are designed to be linear. This means they obey the superposition principle; if $\ F(v)\$ is the output of a linear element with an input of $\ v\$:

$$\ F(v_1 + v_2) = F(v_1) + F(v_2)\$$

So if two sine wave signals at frequencies f_{1} and f_{2} are applied to a linear device, the output is simply the sum of the outputs when the two signals are applied separately with no product terms. Thus, the function $F$ must be nonlinear to create mixer products. A perfect multiplier only produces mixer products at the sum and difference frequencies (f_{1} ± f_{2}), but more general nonlinear functions produce higher order mixer products: n⋅f_{1} + m⋅f_{2} for integers n and m. Some mixer designs, such as double-balanced mixers, suppress some high order undesired products, while other designs, such as harmonic mixers exploit high order differences.

Examples of nonlinear components that are used as mixers are vacuum tubes and transistors biased near cutoff (class C), and diodes. Ferromagnetic core inductors driven into saturation can also be used at lower frequencies. In nonlinear optics, crystals that have nonlinear characteristics are used to mix laser light beams to create optical heterodyne frequencies.

=== Output of a mixer ===
To demonstrate mathematically how a nonlinear component can multiply signals and generate heterodyne frequencies, the nonlinear function $F$ can be expanded in a power series (MacLaurin series):

$$\ F(v) = \alpha_1 v + \alpha_2 v^2 + \alpha_3 v^3 + \cdots\$$

To simplify the math, the higher order terms above α_{2} are indicated by an ellipsis ($\ \cdots\$) and only the first terms are shown. Applying the two sine waves at frequencies ω_{1} = 2πf_{1} and ω_{2} = 2πf_{2} to this device:

$$\ v_\mathsf{out} = F\Bigl(A_1 \cos(\omega_1 t) + A_2 \cos(\omega_2 t) \Bigr)\$$

$$\ v_\mathsf{out} = \alpha_1 \Bigl( A_1 \cos(\omega_1 t) + A_2 \cos(\omega_2 t) \Bigr) + \alpha_2 \Bigl( A_1 \cos(\omega_1 t) + A_2 \cos(\omega_2 t) \Bigr)^2 + \cdots\$$

$$\ v_\mathsf{out} = \alpha_1 \Bigl( A_1 \cos(\omega_1 t) + A_2 \cos(\omega_2 t)\Bigr) + \alpha_2 \Bigl( A_1^2 \cos^2(\omega_1 t) + 2 A_1 A_2 \cos(\omega_1 t)\ \cos(\omega_2 t) + A_2^2 \cos^2(\omega_2 t) \Bigr) + \cdots\$$

It can be seen that the second term above contains a product of the two sine waves. Simplifying with trigonometric identities:

$$\begin{align}
v_\mathsf{out} = {} & \alpha_1 \Bigl( A_1 \cos(\omega_1 t) + A_2 \cos(\omega_2 t) \Bigr) \\
& {} + \alpha_2 \Bigl( \tfrac{1}{2} A_1^2 [ 1 + \cos(2 \omega_1 t) ] + A_1 A_2 [\cos(\omega_1 t - \omega_2 t ) + \cos (\omega_1 t + \omega_2 t) ] + \tfrac{1}{2} A_2^2 [ 1 + \cos(2 \omega_2 t) ] \Bigr) + \cdots
\end{align}$$

Which leaves the two heterodyne frequencies among the many terms:

$$\ v_\mathsf{out} = \cdots + \alpha_2 A_1 A_2 \cos (\omega_1 - \omega_2 )t + \alpha_2 A_1 A_2 \cos (\omega_1 + \omega_2 ) t + \cdots\$$

along with many other terms not shown.

In addition to components with frequencies at the sum ω_{1} + ω_{2} and difference ω_{1} − ω_{2} of the two original frequencies, shown above, the output also contains sinusoidal terms at the original frequencies and terms at multiples of the original frequencies 2 ω_{1} , 2 ω_{2} , 3 ω_{1} , 3 ω_{2} , etc., called harmonics. It also contains much more complicated terms at frequencies of M ω_{1} + N ω_{2} , called intermodulation products. These unwanted frequencies, along with the unwanted heterodyne frequency, must be removed from the mixer output by an electronic filter, to leave the desired heterodyne frequency.

== See also ==
- Electroencephalography
- Homodyne
- Intermodulation – a problem with strong higher-order terms produced in some non-linear mixers
- Transverter
