= Harmonic mixer =

The harmonic mixer and subharmonic mixer are a type of frequency mixer, which is a circuit that changes one signal frequency to another. The ordinary mixer has two input signals and one output signal. If the two input signals are sinewaves at frequencies f_{1} and f_{2}, then the output signal consists of frequency components at the sum f_{1}+f_{2} and difference f_{1}−f_{2} frequencies. In contrast, the harmonic and subharmonic mixers form sum and difference frequencies at a harmonic multiple of one of the inputs. The output signal then contains frequencies such as f_{1}+kf_{2} and f_{1}−kf_{2} where k is an integer.

== Background ==
The classic frequency mixer is a multiplier. Multiplying two sinewaves produces just the sum and difference frequencies; the input frequencies are suppressed, and, in theory, there are no other heterodyne products. In practice, the multiplier is not perfect, and the input frequencies and other heterodyne products will be present.

An actual multiplier is not needed. The significant requirement is a nonlinearity, and at microwave frequencies it is easier to use a nonlinearity rather than an ideal multiplier. A Taylor series expansion of a nonlinearity will show multiplications that give rise to the desired higher order products.

Design goals for mixers seek to select the desired heterodyne products and suppress the undesired ones.

Diode mixers.

Overdriven diode bridge mixers. Drive signal looks like odd harmonic waveform (essentially a square wave).

== Design ==
One classic design for a harmonic mixer uses a step recovery diode (SRD). The mixer's subharmonic input is first amplified to a power level that might be around 1 watt. That signal then drives a step recovery diode impulse generator circuit that turns the sine wave into something approximating an impulse train. The resulting impulse train has the harmonics of the input sine wave present to a high frequency (such as 18 GHz). The impulse train can then be used with a diode mixer (also called a sampler). The SRD usually has a very high frequency multiplication ratio, and can be used as the basis of a comb receiver, monitoring several harmonically related frequencies at once. This forms the basis of many simple 'bug detectors' where the intention is to detect transmission on any frequency, even if not known in advance. (This is not the same as a 'rake' receiver which is a correlation device.)

When the required frequency multiple is lower, such as doubling, tripling or quadrupling, then Schottky diode circuits are more common. The conduction angle can be adjusted by changing drive level or temperature, and determines which part of the I/V curve is used and therefore the relative strengths of the different harmonically related outputs. If an even multiple is desired then an anti-parallel pair of diodes will suppress the odd local oscillator contribution, to the level that the diodes can be made identical and experience the same source impedance. Unlike a normal mixer, there is a fairly clear optimum drive level, above which the conversion loss increases.

A harmonic mixer can be used to avoid the complexity of generating a microwave local oscillator, and is common as a simple and reliable frequency extender to a low frequency design.

== Usage ==
Subharmonic mixers (a particular form of harmonic mixer where the LO is provided at a sub multiple of the frequency to be mixed with the incoming signal) are often used in direct-digital, or zero IF, communications system in order to eliminate the unwanted effects of LO self-mixing which occurs in many fundamental frequency mixers.

Used in frequency synthesizers and network analyzers.

A variation on the subharmonic mixer exists that has two switching stages is used to improved mixer gain in a direct downconversion receiver. The first switching stage mixes a received RF signal to an intermediate frequency that is one-half the received RF signal frequency. The second switching stage mixes the intermediate frequency to baseband. By connecting the two switching stages in series, current is reused and harmonic content from the first stage is fed into the second stage thereby improving the mixer gain.

== See also ==
- Frequency multiplier
- Sampling (signal processing)

Synthesizer using harmonic mixing
