= Low IF receiver =

Type of receiver design for radio signals

In a low-IF receiver, the radio frequency (RF) signal is mixed down to a non-zero low or moderate intermediate frequency (IF) in the range of a few hundred kilohertz.

Typical frequency values are a few megahertz (instead of 33–40 MHz) for TV, and even lower frequencies, typically 120–130 kHz (instead of 10.7–10.8 MHz or 13.45 MHz) in the case of FM radio receivers or 455–470 kHz for AM radio (MW/LW/SW) receivers. Low-IF receiver topologies have many of the desirable properties of zero-IF architectures, but avoid the DC offset and 1/f noise problems.

The use of a non-zero IF re-introduces the image issue. However, when there are relatively relaxed image and neighboring channel rejection requirements they can be satisfied by carefully designed low-IF receivers. Image signal and unwanted blockers can be rejected by quadrature down-conversion (complex mixing) and subsequent filtering.

This technique is now widely used in the tiny FM receivers incorporated into MP3 players and mobile phones and is becoming commonplace in both analog and digital TV receiver designs. Using advanced analog- and digital signal processing techniques, cheap, high quality receivers using no resonant circuits at all are now possible.
