= Intermediate frequency =

Frequency to which a carrier wave is shifted during transmission or reception

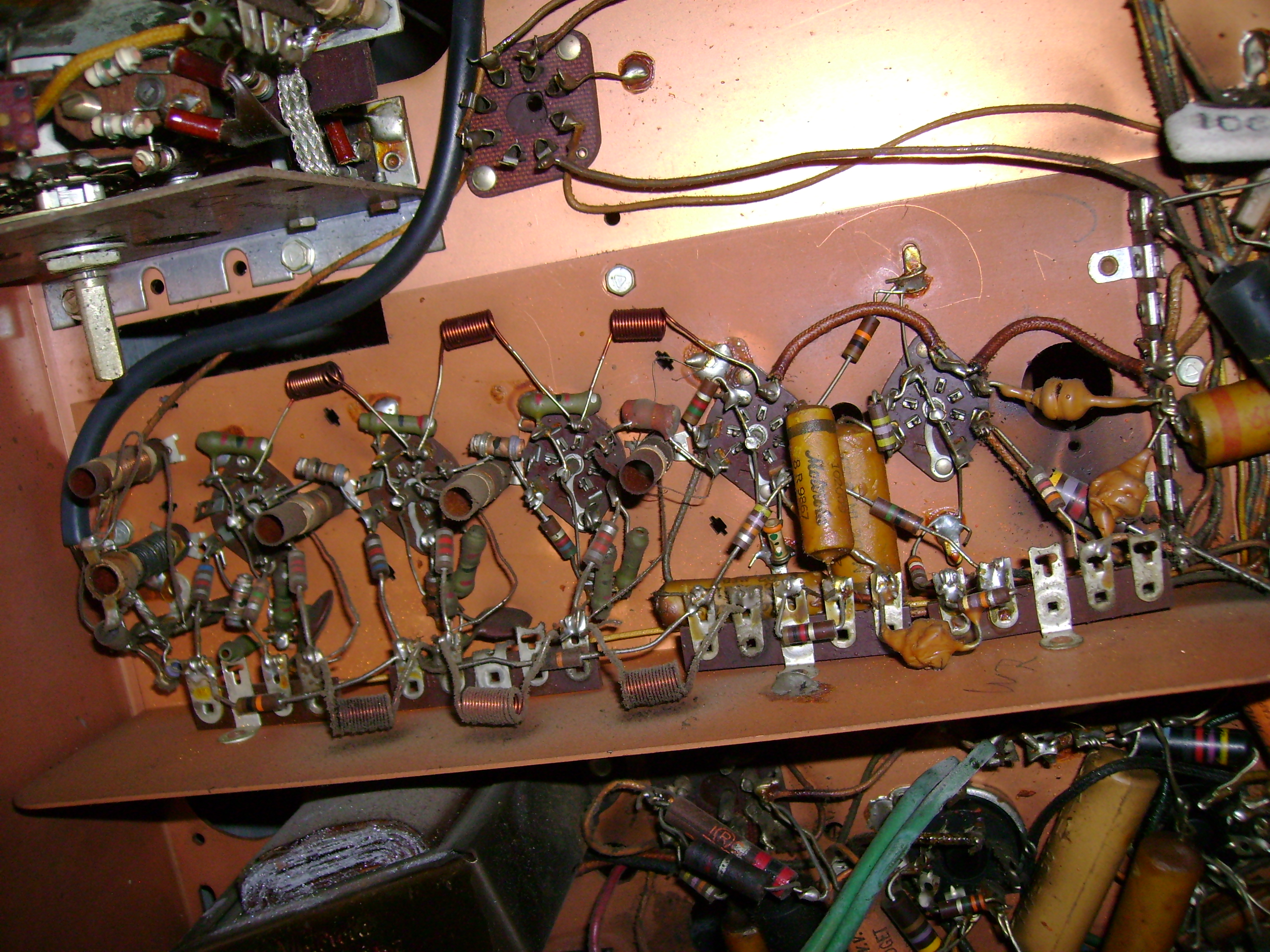
The IF stage from a Motorola 19K1 television set circa 1949

In communications and electronic engineering, an intermediate frequency (IF) is a frequency to which a carrier wave is shifted as an intermediate step in transmission or reception. The intermediate frequency is created by mixing the carrier signal with a local oscillator signal in a process called heterodyning, resulting in a signal at the difference or beat frequency. Intermediate frequencies are used in superheterodyne radio receivers, in which an incoming signal is shifted to an IF for amplification before final detection is done.

Conversion to an intermediate frequency is useful for several reasons. When several stages of filters are used, they can all be set to a fixed frequency, which makes them easier to build and to tune. Lower frequency transistors generally have higher gains so fewer stages are required. It's easier to make sharply selective filters at lower fixed frequencies.

There may be several such stages of intermediate frequency in a superheterodyne receiver; two or three stages are called double (alternatively, dual) or triple conversion, respectively.

== Justification ==
Intermediate frequencies are used for three general reasons. At very high (gigahertz) frequencies, signal processing circuitry performs poorly. Active devices such as transistors cannot deliver much amplification (gain). Ordinary circuits using capacitors and inductors must be replaced with cumbersome high frequency techniques such as striplines and waveguides. So a high frequency signal is converted to a lower IF for more convenient processing. For example, in satellite dishes, the microwave downlink signal received by the dish is converted to a much lower IF at the dish so that a relatively inexpensive coaxial cable can carry the signal to the receiver inside the building. Bringing the signal in at the original microwave frequency would require an expensive waveguide.

In receivers that can be tuned to different frequencies, a second reason is to convert the various different frequencies of the stations to a common frequency for processing. It is difficult to build multistage amplifiers, filters, and detectors that can have all stages track the tuning of different frequencies, but it is comparatively easy to build tunable oscillators. Superheterodyne receivers tune in different frequencies by adjusting the frequency of the local oscillator on the input stage, and all processing after that is done at the same fixed frequency: the IF. Without using an IF, all the complicated filters and detectors in a radio or television would have to be tuned in unison each time the frequency was changed as was necessary in the early tuned radio frequency receivers (TRF). A more important advantage is that it gives the receiver a constant bandwidth over its tuning range. The bandwidth of a filter is proportional to its center frequency. In receivers like the TRF in which the filtering is done at the incoming RF frequency, as the receiver is tuned to higher frequencies, its bandwidth increases.

The main reason for using an intermediate frequency is to improve frequency selectivity. In communication circuits, a very common task is to separate out, or extract, signals or components of a signal that are close together in frequency. This is called filtering. Some examples are: picking up a radio station among several that are close in frequency, or extracting the chrominance subcarrier from a TV signal. With all known filtering techniques the filter's bandwidth increases proportionately with the frequency. So a narrower bandwidth and more selectivity can be achieved by converting the signal to a lower IF and performing the filtering at that frequency. FM and television broadcasting with their narrow channel widths, as well as more modern telecommunications services such as cell phones and cable television, would be impossible without using frequency conversion.

== Uses ==
Perhaps the most commonly used intermediate frequencies for broadcast receivers are around 455 kHz for AM receivers and 10.7 MHz for FM receivers. In special purpose receivers other frequencies can be used. A dual-conversion receiver may have two intermediate frequencies, a higher one to improve image rejection and a second, lower one, for desired selectivity. A first intermediate frequency may even be higher than the input signal, so that all undesired responses can be easily filtered out by a fixed-tuned RF stage.

In a digital receiver, the analog-to-digital converter (ADC) operates at low sampling rates, so input RF is often mixed down to IF to be processed. Intermediate frequency tends to be lower frequency range compared to the transmitted RF frequency. However, the choices for the IF are most dependent on the available components such as mixer, filters, amplifiers and others that can operate at lower frequency. There are other factors involved in deciding the IF, because lower IF is susceptible to noise and higher IF can cause clock jitters.

Modern satellite television receivers use several intermediate frequencies. The 500 television channels of a typical system are transmitted from the satellite to subscribers in the Ku microwave band, in two subbands of 10.7–11.7 and 11.7–12.75 GHz. The downlink signal is received by a satellite dish. In the box at the focus of the dish, called a low-noise block downconverter (LNB), each block of frequencies is converted to the IF range of 950–2150 MHz by two fixed frequency local oscillators at 9.75 and 10.6 GHz. One of the two blocks is selected by a control signal from the set top box inside, which switches on one of the local oscillators. This IF is carried into the building to the television receiver on a coaxial cable. At the cable company's set top box, the signal is converted to a lower IF of 480 MHz for filtering, by a variable frequency oscillator. This is sent through a 30 MHz bandpass filter, which selects the signal from one of the transponders on the satellite, which carries several channels. Further processing selects the channel desired, demodulates it and sends the signal to the television.

== Digitized Intermediate Frequency ==
In digital radio receivers an analog intermediate frequency may be sampled by an Analog-to-digital converter, allowing subsequent filtering, frequency conversation, and channel selection to be performed using Digital signal processing. Digital downconverters can translate sampled IF signals to lower frequencies or complex baseband while digital upconverters perform corresponding functions in transmission systems. Advances in high-speed data converters have also enabled direct RF sampling architectures that eliminate the need for an analog IF stage.

Digitized IF can also be used to distribute radio-frequency signals between components of a communications system. In satellite ground stations, analog IF signals can be converted into digital sample streams and transported over Ethernet or Internet Protocol (IP) networks. This allows antenna-side radio-frequency equipment and downstream signal-processing systems to be connected through digital network infrastructure instead of exclusively through dedicated analog IF connections. NASA has also described a ground-system architecture using a 10-gigabit Ethernet digital IF distribution network connected to a pool of digital modems.

Digital IF streams may contain sampled waveforms represented as in-phase and quadrature (I/Q) components. Transporting these signals over packet networks introduces engineering considerations involving data bandwidth, timing synchronization, latency, and signal reconstruction.

The Digital Intermediate Frequency Interoperability (DIFI) standard, published as IEEE-ISTO Std 4900, defines an interface for exchanging digitized IF signals and associated metadata over IP networks. It is intended to support interoperability between equipment from different manufacturers, particularly in satellite ground-segment applications.

The US Army began the migration to digital IF with the award of the Enterprise Digital IF Multicarrier modem in 2023.

== History ==
An intermediate frequency was first used in the superheterodyne radio receiver, invented by American scientist Major Edwin Armstrong in 1918, during World War I. A member of the Signal Corps, Armstrong was building radio direction finding equipment to track German military signals at the then-very high frequencies of 500 to 3500 kHz. The triode vacuum tube amplifiers of the day would not amplify stably above 500 kHz; however, it was easy to get them to oscillate above that frequency. Armstrong's solution was to set up an oscillator tube that would create a frequency near the incoming signal and mix it with the incoming signal in a mixer tube, creating a heterodyne or signal at the lower difference frequency where it could be amplified easily. For example, to pick up a signal at 1500 kHz the local oscillator would be tuned to 1450 kHz. Mixing the two created an intermediate frequency of 50 kHz, which was well within the capability of the tubes. The name superheterodyne was a contraction of supersonic heterodyne, to distinguish it from receivers in which the heterodyne frequency was low enough to be directly audible, and which were used for receiving continuous wave (CW) Morse code transmissions (not speech or music).

After the war, in 1920, Armstrong sold the patent for the superheterodyne to Westinghouse, who subsequently sold it to RCA. The increased complexity of the superheterodyne circuit compared to earlier regenerative or tuned radio frequency receiver designs slowed its use, but the advantages of the intermediate frequency for selectivity and static rejection eventually won out; by 1930, most radios sold were 'superhets'. During the development of radar in World War II, the superheterodyne principle was essential for downconversion of the very high radar frequencies to intermediate frequencies. Since then, the superheterodyne circuit, with its intermediate frequency, has been used in virtually all radio receivers.

== Examples ==
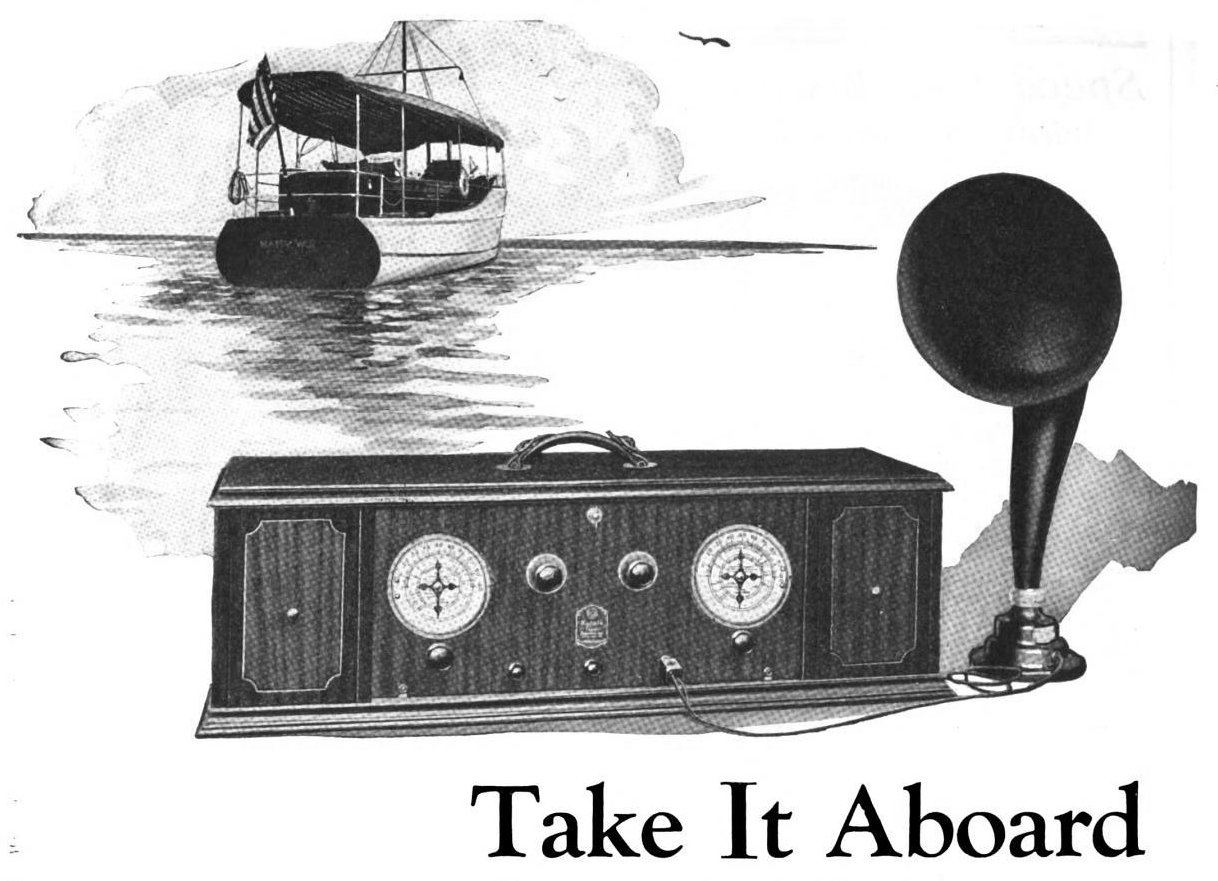
The RCA Radiola AR-812 used 6 triodes: a mixer, local oscillator, two IF and two audio amplifier stages, with an IF of 45 kHz.

- down to c. 20 kHz, 30 kHz (A. L. M. Sowerby and H. B. Dent), 45 kHz (first commercial superheterodyne receiver: RCA Radiola AR-812 of 1923/1924), c. 50 kHz, c. 100 kHz, c. 120 kHz
- 110 kHz was used in European AM longwave broadcast receivers.
- 175 kHz (early wide band and communications receivers before introduction of powdered iron cores)
- 260 kHz (early standard broadcast receivers), 250–270 kHz
- Copenhagen Frequency Allocations: 415–490 kHz, 510–525 kHz
- AM radio receivers: 450 kHz, 455 kHz (most common), 460 kHz, 465 kHz, 467 kHz, 470 kHz, 475 kHz, and 480 kHz.
- FM radio receivers: 262 kHz (old car radios), 455 kHz, 1.6 MHz, 5.5 MHz, 10.7 MHz (most common), 10.8 MHz, 11.2 MHz, 11.7 MHz, 11.8 MHz, 13.45 MHz, 21.4 MHz, 75 MHz and 98 MHz. In double-conversion superheterodyne receivers, a first intermediate frequency of 10.7 MHz is often used, followed by a second intermediate frequency of 470 kHz (or 700 kHz with DYNAS). There are triple conversion designs used in police scanner receivers, high-end communications receivers, and many point-to-point microwave systems. Modern DSP chip consumer radios often use a 'low-IF' of 128 kHz for FM.
- Narrowband FM receivers: 455 kHz (most common), 470 kHz
- Shortwave receivers: 1.6 MHz, 1.6–3.0 MHz, 4.3 MHz (for 40–50 MHz-only receivers). In double-conversion superheterodyne receivers, a first intermediate frequency of 3.0 MHz is sometimes combined with a second IF of 465 kHz.
- Analogue television receivers using system M: 41.25 MHz (audio) and 45.75 MHz (video). Note, the channel is flipped over in the conversion process in an intercarrier system, so the audio IF is lower than the video IF. Also, there is no audio local oscillator; the injected video carrier serves that purpose.
- Analogue television receivers using system B and similar systems: 33.4 MHz for the aural and 38.9 MHz for the visual signal. (The discussion about the frequency conversion is the same as in system M.)
- Satellite uplink-downlink equipment: 70 MHz, 950–1450 MHz (L-band) downlink first IF.
- Terrestrial microwave equipment: 250 MHz, 70 MHz or 75 MHz.
- Radar: 30 MHz.
- RF test equipment: 310.7 MHz, 160 MHz, and 21.4 MHz.

== See also ==
- Low-IF receiver
- Mechanical filter
- Zero-IF receiver
