= Local oscillator =

Oscillator used to change Signal frequency in electronics

In electronics, the term local oscillator (LO) refers to an electronic oscillator when used in conjunction with a mixer to change the frequency of a signal. This frequency conversion process, also called heterodyning, produces the sum and difference frequencies from the frequency of the local oscillator and frequency of the input signal to the mixer. Processing a signal at a fixed frequency gives a radio receiver improved performance. In many receivers, the function of local oscillator and mixer is combined in one stage called a "converter" - this reduces the space, cost, and power consumption by combining both functions into one active device.

The term local refers to the fact that the frequency is generated within the circuit and is not reliant on any external signals, although the frequency of the oscillator may be tuned according to external signals.

== Applications ==
Block diagram of a typical single-conversion superheterodyne receiver. The diagram has blocks that are common to superheterodyne receivers with only the RF amplifier being optional. Red parts are those that handle the incoming radio frequency (RF) signal; green are parts that operate at the intermediate frequency (IF), while blue parts operate at the modulation (audio) frequency. The dotted line indicates that the local oscillator and RF filter must be tuned in tandem.

Local oscillators are used in the superheterodyne receiver, the most common type of radio receiver circuit. In this application, the frequency of the local oscillator (LO) is chosen to be similar to the radio frequency (RF) received on the antenna, such that the difference between them is much smaller than the RF. Either high-side injection (where the LO frequency is greater than the RF) or low-side injection (where the LO frequency is less than the RF) may be employed. The difference can then be filtered from the sum to extract the intermediate frequency (IF).

- For high-side injection, $f_\mathrm{IF} = f_\mathrm{LO} - f_\mathrm{RF}$.
- For low-side injection, $f_\mathrm{IF} = f_\mathrm{RF} - f_\mathrm{LO}$.

So the frequency chosen for the local oscillator should be $f_\mathrm{LO} = f_\mathrm{RF} \pm f_\mathrm{IF}$.

They are also used in many other communications circuits such as modems, cable television set top boxes, frequency division multiplexing systems used in telephone trunklines, microwave relay systems, telemetry systems, atomic clocks, radio telescopes, and military electronic countermeasure (antijamming) systems. In satellite television reception, the microwave frequencies used from the satellite down to the receiving antenna are converted to lower frequencies by a local oscillator and mixer mounted at the antenna. This allows the received signals to be sent over a length of cable that would otherwise have unacceptable signal loss at the original reception frequency. In this application, the local oscillator is of a fixed frequency and the down-converted signal frequency is variable.

== Performance requirements ==
The performance of a signal processing system depends, amongst other factors, on the characteristics of the local oscillator.

- Emissions - receiver design requires care to ensure no spurious signals are radiated by the local oscillator. Such signals can cause interference in the operation of other receivers.
- Stability - the local oscillator must produce a stable frequency with low harmonics. Stability must take into account temperature, voltage, and mechanical drift as factors.
- Power - the oscillator must produce enough output power to effectively drive subsequent stages of circuitry, such as mixers or frequency multipliers.
- Noise - it must have low phase noise where the timing of the signal is critical.
- Precision - in a channelized receiver system, the precision of tuning of the frequency synthesizer must be compatible with the channel spacing of the desired signals.

== Types of LO ==
A crystal oscillator is one common type of local oscillator that provides good stability and performance at relatively low cost, but its frequency is fixed, so changing frequencies requires changing the crystal. Tuning to different frequencies requires a variable-frequency oscillator which leads to a compromise between stability and tunability. With the advent of high-speed digital microelectronics, modern systems can use frequency synthesizers to obtain a stable tunable local oscillator, but care must still be taken to maintain adequate noise characteristics in the result. Phase-locked loops are an alternative means of generating precise LO frequencies. By synchronizing with another frequency source, this method ensures a high level of accuracy and stability.

== Unintended LO emissions ==
Detection of local oscillator radiation may disclose the presence of the receiver, such as in detection of automotive radar detectors, or detection of unlicensed television broadcast receivers in some countries. During World War II, Allied soldiers were not allowed to have superheterodyne receivers because the Axis soldiers had equipment which could detect the local oscillator emissions. This led to soldiers creating what is now known as a foxhole radio, a simple improvised radio receiver which has no local oscillator.

The better WW II military communication receivers were engineered to suppress local oscillator emissions. For example, the famous RCA AR-88 has excellent shielding. It also uses two tuned pentode RF stages ahead of the superheterodyne mixer. Pentode tubes have virtually zero reverse gain so LO emissions could not back out through the antenna.

== See also ==
- Direct conversion receiver
- Homodyne detection
- Heterodyne detection
- Optical heterodyne detection
- NE612, oscillator and a Gilbert cell multiplier mixer.
