= Alexander M. Nicolson =

American inventor of the crystal oscillator

Alexander McLean Nicolson (1880/1881 – February 3, 1950) was an American scientist and engineer, most notable for inventing the first crystal oscillator, using a piece of Rochelle salt in 1917 while working at Western Electric. He then filed a patent the following year. His priority was later disputed by Walter Guyton Cady, who invented the first quartz crystal oscillator in 1921.

His surname is sometimes spelled Nicholson in later sources.

== Career ==
Nicolson worked for Western Electric and AT&T among other industrial and telecommunication companies. He was active in research on piezoelectricity, radio communication, and television during the 1910s and 1920s.

In addition to the crystal oscillator, Nicolson received patents for several other devices, including early television transmission systems (1923) and numerous radio accessories. His work led contemporaries to describe him as a "video pioneer."

== Inventions and patents ==
- 1918 – Patent filed for a crystal-controlled oscillator using Rochelle salt (granted 1940).
- 1923 – Patent related to television image transmission.
- Several other patents on radio and acoustic devices assigned to Western Electric.

== Legacy ==
Nicolson's 1917 oscillator was the first practical demonstration of piezoelectric frequency control. Although Walter Guyton Cady’s quartz oscillator (1921) became more commercially influential, later surveys of frequency control and time measurement cite Nicolson's work as an important precursor in the development of modern electronics.

== Death ==
Nicolson died in New York City on February 3, 1950, at the age of 69.
