= GPS-disciplined oscillator =

Combination of a GPS receiver and a stable oscillator

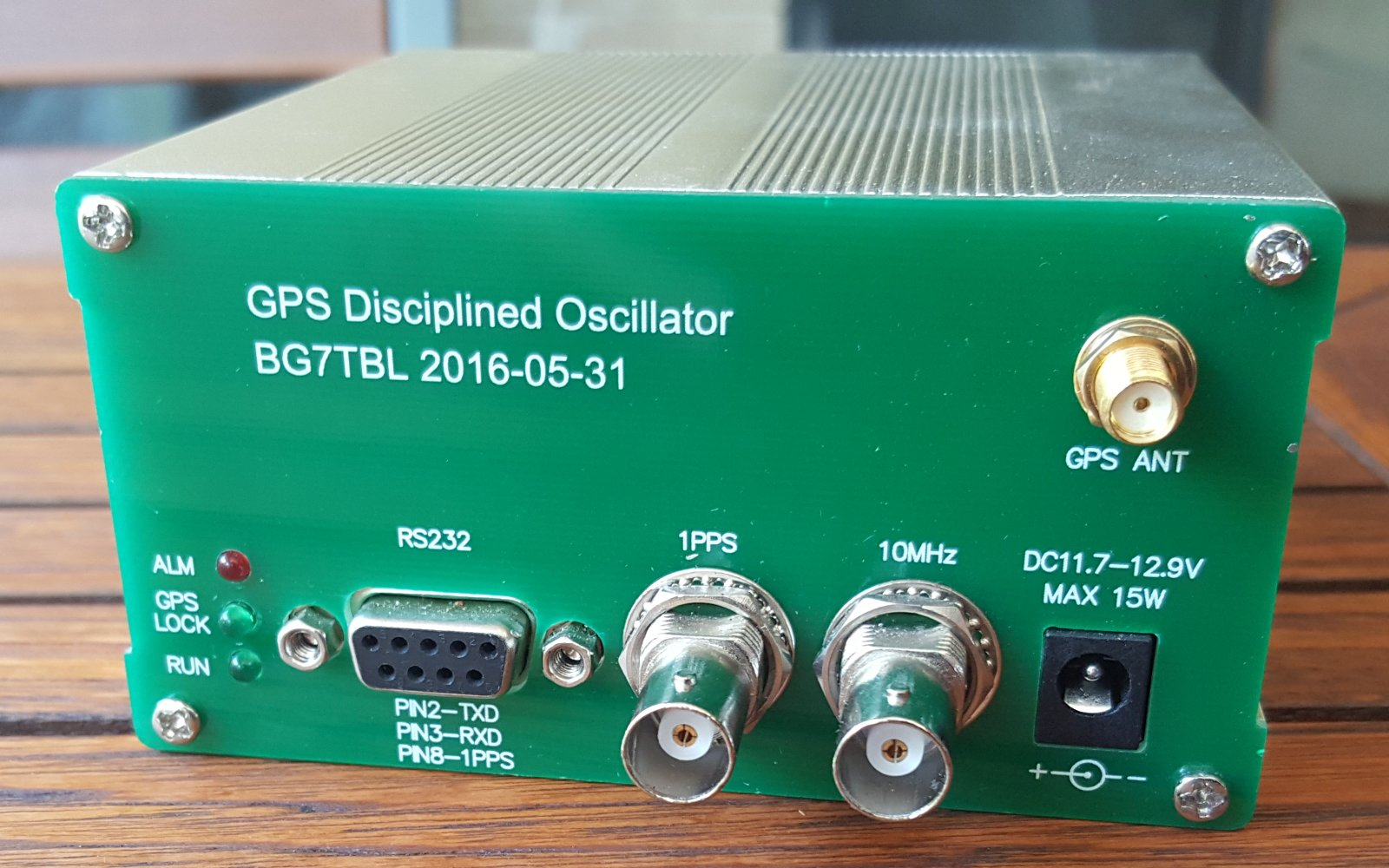
A GPS-disciplined oscillator unit with a GPS antenna input, 10 MHz and 1 pulse-per-second outputs, and an RS-232 interface

A GPS clock, or GPS-disciplined oscillator (GPSDO), is a combination of a GPS receiver and a high-quality, stable oscillator such as a quartz or rubidium oscillator whose output is controlled to agree with the signals broadcast by GPS or other GNSS satellites. GPSDOs work well as a source of timing because the satellite time signals must be accurate in order to provide positional accuracy for GPS in navigation. These signals are accurate to nanoseconds and provide a good reference for timing applications.

== Applications ==
GPSDOs serve as an indispensable source of timing in a range of applications, and some technology applications would not be practical without them. UTC is the official accepted standard for time and frequency. UTC is controlled by the International Bureau of Weights and Measures (BIPM). Timing centers around the world use GPS to align their own time scales to UTC. GPS based standards are used to provide synchronization to wireless base stations and serve well in standards laboratories as an alternative to cesium-based references.

GPSDOs can be used to provide synchronization of multiple RF receivers, allowing for RF phase-coherent operation among the receivers and applications, such as passive radar and ionosondes.

== Operation ==
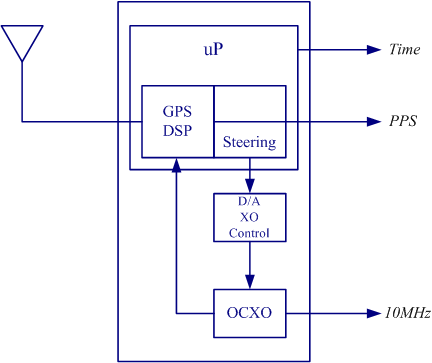
A modern GPSDO

A GPSDO works by disciplining, or steering a high-quality quartz or rubidium oscillator by locking the output to a GPS signal via a tracking loop. The disciplining mechanism works in a similar way to a phase-locked loop (PLL), but in most GPSDOs the loop filter is replaced with a microcontroller that uses software to compensate for not only the phase and frequency changes of the local oscillator, but also for the "learned" effects of aging, temperature, and other environmental parameters.

One of the keys to the usefulness of a GPSDO as a timing reference is the way it is able to combine the stability characteristics of the GPS signal and the oscillator controlled by the tracking loop. GPS receivers have excellent long-term stability (as characterized by their Allan deviation) at averaging times greater than several hours. However, their short-term stability is degraded by limitations of the internal resolution of the one pulse per second (1PPS) reference timing circuits, signal propagation effects such as multipath interference, atmospheric conditions, and other impairments. On the other hand, a quality oven-controlled oscillator has better short-term stability but is susceptible to thermal, aging, and other long-term effects. A GPSDO aims to utilize the best of both sources, combining the short-term stability performance of the oscillator with the long-term stability of the GPS signals to give a reference source with excellent overall stability characteristics.

GPSDOs typically phase-align the internal flywheel oscillator to the GPS signal by using dividers to generate a 1PPS signal from the reference oscillator, then phase comparing this 1PPS signal to the GPS-generated 1PPS signal and using the phase differences to control the local oscillator frequency in small adjustments via the tracking loop. This differentiates GPSDOs from their cousins NCOs (numerically controlled oscillator). Rather than disciplining an oscillator via frequency adjustments, NCOs typically use a free-running, low-cost crystal oscillator and adjust the output phase by digitally lengthening or shortening the output phase many times per second in large phase steps, assuring that on average the number of phase transitions per second is aligned to the GPS receiver reference source. This guarantees frequency accuracy at the expense of high phase noise and jitter, a degradation that true GPSDOs do not suffer.

When the GPS signal becomes unavailable, the GPSDO goes into a state of holdover, where it tries to maintain accurate timing using only the internal oscillator.

Sophisticated algorithms are used to compensate for the aging and temperature stability of the oscillator while the GPSDO is in holdover.

The use of Selective Availability (SA) prior to May 2000 restricted the accuracy of GPS signals available for civilian use and in turn presented challenges to the accuracy of GPSDO-derived timing. The turning off of SA resulted in a significant increase in the accuracy that GPSDOs can offer. GPSDOs are capable of generating frequency accuracies and stabilities on the order of parts per billion for even entry-level, low-cost units, to parts per trillion for more advanced units within minutes after power-on, and are thus one of the highest-accuracy physically-derived reference standards available.

== Form factor ==
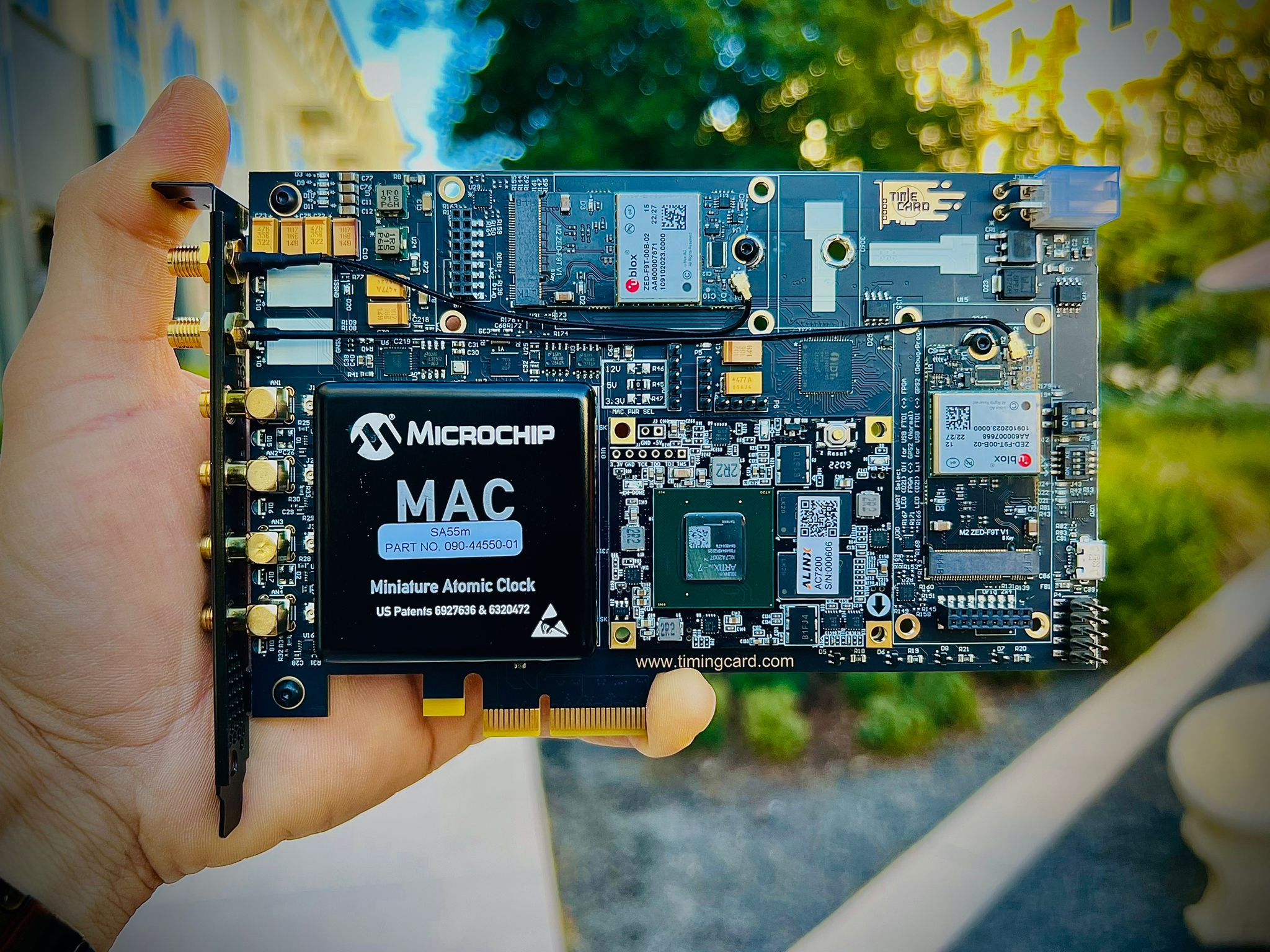
PCIe Modular GPSDOs Open Time Card

GPSDOs could be:

- fully encapsulated, portable and standalone
- board-mounted
- modular, connecting via external interface such as PCIe or USB-C, such as in this device.

The main difference is in the size and the power source. A standalone GPSDO may require an external power supply. Board-mounted and modular GPSDOs can draw power from the Motherboard, USB-C, or phantom power via a bias T.
