= Issac Koga =

Japanese inventor and scientist

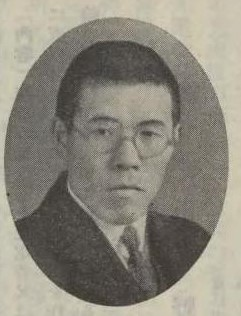
Image of Koga Issaku

Issac Koga (古賀 逸策, Koga Issaku; December 5, 1899 – September 2, 1982) was a Japanese inventor and scientist.

== Early life and education ==
Koga was the eldest of seven children born in Tashiro Village (now Tosu), Saga Prefecture. In July 1920, at the age of 20, he started to study at the Department of Electrical Engineering at Tokyo Imperial University (later renamed University of Tokyo). After graduation in August 1925, he moved to the new Tokyo City Electrical Institute, which was established to develop and promote radio broadcasting technology under the directorship of Kotaro Kujirai, a pioneer of the research and teaching of radio science.

Initially an engineer, he became an assistant professor in 1929. Under the guidance of Professor Kujirai, he studied crystal oscillators. This formed the basis of his PhD thesis, completed in April 1930, entitled "Characteristics of the Crystal Oscillator." This work included making the first quartz tuning forks in 1927. In 1929, he became an associate professor at the Tokyo Institute of Technology and a professor in 1939. In 1944, he worked as a concurrent professor at the University of Tokyo, later became a professor emeritus there, and reached emeritus status at Tokyo Institute of Technology in 1961.

== Research works ==
Koga's research and education were in the areas of electronics and communications. Koga is an inventor of temperature insensitive quartz cut (R1-cut) of quartz plate quartz crystal: in April 1933, Issac Koga at Tokyo Institute of Technology reported R1-cut quartz crystal plates having a zero temperature-coefficient of frequency. He applied the R1-cut plate to wireless communications and quartz clocks; his achievement provided stable frequency of oscillator used in communications and clocks for time standard. This type of temperature-insensitive quartz crystal oscillator has been indispensable to all radio communication systems and much of information electronics.

== Awards and recognitions ==
Koga was awarded the Japan Academy Prize in 1948 (the citation reads for "Theoretical and Experimental Investigation upon the Fundamental Characteristics of Piezoelectric Oscillating Crystal and Quartz Crystal Oscillator Circuit and Their Applications to Wireless Communication and Crystal Clock"), the Order of Cultural Merit award in 1963 and became a member of the Japanese Academy in 1971. He served as president of the International Union of Radio Science (URSI) between 1963 and 1968.

Koga died on September 2, 1982. In his honor, the International Union of Radio Science, URSI, named a young scientist award after him (the Issac Koga Gold Medal) first awarded in 1984 and subsequently awarded every 3 years.
