= Walter Guyton Cady =

American physicist and electrical engineer

- Born: December 10, 1874; Providence, Rhode Island, United States
- Died: December 9, 1974 (aged 99); East Providence, Rhode Island, United States
- Education: Brown University
- Relatives: John Hutchins Cady (brother)
- Scientific career
- Fields: Physics

Walter Guyton Cady (December 10, 1874 – December 9, 1974) was an American physicist and electrical engineer. He was a pioneer in piezoelectricity, and in 1921 developed the first quartz crystal oscillator.

Cady was born in Providence, Rhode Island, graduated from Brown University in 1895, and studied 1897-1900 at the University of Berlin, receiving his Ph.D. in Physics in 1900. (From 1895 to 1897 he was also instructor in mathematics at Brown.) He was a magnetic observer from 1900 to 1902 with the United States Coast and Geodetic Survey, and from 1902 to 1946 he was a professor of physics at Wesleyan University, where his principal interests included electrical discharges in gases, piezoelectricity, ultrasound, piezoelectric resonators and oscillators, and crystal devices.

Before World War I, Cady investigated arc discharges and radio detectors, but during the war became interested in crystals as he worked with General Electric Company's Research Laboratory, Columbia University, and the Naval Experimental Station in New London, Connecticut, on using high-frequency sound generated by piezoelectricity to detect submarines. His early experiments employed Rochelle salt crystals as transducers. After noticing that a quartz crystal connected to a variable-frequency electronic oscillator would vibrate strongly at a very specific frequency, but that at other frequencies it would not vibrate at all, he had the insight to apply crystal oscillators to radio frequency applications.

In 1921 Cady designed the first circuit to control frequencies based on quartz crystal resonator, and received two fundamental patents on resonators and their applications to radio in 1923. Cady quickly realized that such circuits could be used as frequency standards, in 1922 published an IRE paper on this application, and in 1923 made the first direct international comparison of frequency standards by comparing his quartz resonators with frequency standards in Italy, France, England, and the United States. Cady was president of the Institute of Radio Engineers in 1932.

During World War II, Cady again worked on military applications of piezoelectricity, including trainers for radar operators that used piezoelectric transducers in liquid tanks to generate realistic radar returns. He retired to Pasadena, California, in 1951, where he was a research associate at Caltech. He returned to Providence in 1963. After retirement he consulted for industry and the federal government.

Cady held more than 50 patents, and was the inventor of the crystal-controlled oscillator, the highly selective narrow-band crystal filter, one of the principal theorists of the ferroelectricity in crystals, and a historian of the science of piezoelectric crystals. He won the 1928 IEEE Morris N. Liebmann Memorial Award, and in 1936 was the second American to receive the Duddell Medal and Prize of the Physical Society of London. He received honorary degrees from Brown University in 1938, and from Wesleyan in 1958. His papers are archived at the Smithsonian Institution and the Rhode Island Historical Society.
