= Rubidium standard =

Frequency standard

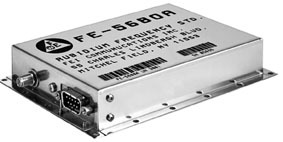
Rb oscillator

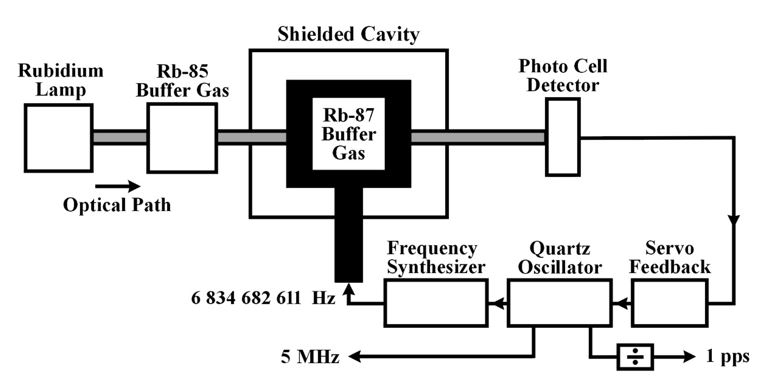
Schematic of a Rubidium Oscillator

A rubidium standard or rubidium atomic clock is a frequency standard in which a specified hyperfine transition of electrons in rubidium-87 atoms is used to control the output frequency.

== Synopsis ==
The Rb standard is the most inexpensive, compact, and widely produced atomic clock, used to control the frequency of television stations, cell phone base stations, in test equipment, and global navigation satellite systems like GPS. Commercial rubidium clocks are less accurate than caesium atomic clocks, which serve as primary frequency standards, so a rubidium clock is usually used as a secondary frequency standard.

Commercial rubidium frequency standards operate by disciplining a crystal oscillator to the rubidium hyperfine transition of 6.8 GHz (6834682610.904 Hz). The intensity of light from a rubidium discharge lamp that reaches a photodetector through a resonance cell will drop by about 0.1% when the rubidium vapor in the resonance cell is exposed to microwave power near the transition frequency. The crystal oscillator is stabilized to the rubidium transition by detecting the light dip while sweeping an RF synthesizer (referenced to the crystal) through the transition frequency.

== See also ==
- Hydrogen maser
