= Motorboating (electronics) =

Low frequency audio feedback

In electronics, motorboating is a type of low frequency parasitic oscillation (unwanted cyclic variation of the output voltage) that sometimes occurs in audio and radio equipment and often manifests itself as a sound similar to an idling motorboat engine, a "put-put-put", in audio output from speakers or earphones. It is a problem encountered particularly in radio transceivers and older vacuum tube audio equipment, guitar amplifiers, PA systems and is caused by some type of unwanted feedback in the circuit. The amplifying devices in audio and radio equipment are vulnerable to a variety of feedback problems, which can cause distinctive noise in the output. The term motorboating is applied to oscillations whose frequency is below the range of hearing, from 1 to 10 hertz, so the individual oscillations are heard as pulses. Sometimes the oscillations can even be seen visually as the woofer cones in speakers slowly moving in and out.

Besides sounding annoying, motorboating can cause clipping of the audio output waveform, and thus distortion in the output.

== Occurrence ==
Although low frequency parasitic oscillations in audio equipment may be due to a range of causes, there are a few types of equipment in which it is frequently seen:

- Older audio amplifiers with capacitive (RC) or inductive (transformer) coupling between stages. This design is mostly used in vacuum tube (valve) equipment. Motorboating was a problem throughout the era of vacuum tube electronics but became rare as vacuum tube gear was replaced in the 1970s with modern solid state designs, which are direct-coupled. The recent resurgence in popularity of traditional tube-type audio equipment in guitar amplifiers and home audio systems has led to a reappearance of motorboating problems. The problem is sometimes caused in older equipment by the evaporation of the electrolyte from old-style "wet" electrolytic capacitors used in the power circuits of legacy equipment, or in equipment of any age where an amplifier stage is sensitive to feedback via power supply rails, and can be remedied by replacing/upgrading the capacitors.
- In both old and new designs, even mostly directly-coupled operational amplifier circuits, feedback through the power supply rails can generate ultrasonic oscillations that vary in amplitude at a low frequency (squegging) due to the power supply voltage sagging as oscillations build up (the long time constant coming from the power supply reservoir capacitor) in such a way that the low frequency is audible even though the high frequency fundamental is not. Such problems can be difficult to diagnose.
- Audio equipment associated with radio transmitters, particularly transceivers in two way radios, such as Citizens band, FRS, which have automatic gain control (AGC) or squelch noise control. Malfunctions in the AGC or squelch circuits, which have long time constants, can cause low frequency oscillation. Another possible cause, sometimes in combination with the first, is leakage of the strong radio frequency (RF) signal from the transmitter into the receiver audio sections, which can cause quenching oscillations. This is a RFI problem, caused by inadequate shielding or filtering to keep the RF out.

== Theory ==
As with all electronic oscillation, motorboating occurs when some of the output energy from an amplifying device like a transistor or vacuum tube gets coupled back into the input circuit of the device (or possibly into an earlier stage of the amplifier circuit) with the proper phase for positive feedback. This indicates there is an unwanted feedback path through the circuit from output to input of an amplifying stage. The technical conditions for oscillation, given by the Barkhausen stability criterion, are that the total gain around the feedback loop (comprising the amplifying device and the feedback path) at the oscillation frequency must be one (0 dB), and that the phase shift must be a multiple of 360° (2π radians). Since most amplifying devices, transistors and tubes, are inverting, with the output signal 180° opposite in phase from the input, the feedback path must contribute the other 180° of shift.

Many types of parasitic oscillation are caused by small interelectrode capacitances (parasitic capacitance) or mutual inductance between adjacent wires or electronic components on the circuit board, which create an inadvertent feedback path. However these usually cause oscillations of high frequency, at the upper end of or above the passband of the equipment. This is because the phase shift of the small reactances in the feedback path, which increases with frequency, only become significant at high frequencies. Low frequency oscillations like motorboating indicate that some device or circuit with a large time constant is involved, such as the interstage coupling capacitors or transformers, or the filter capacitors and supply transformer winding.

In vacuum tube circuits, a common cause is feedback through the plate power supply circuit. The power supply provides DC current to each tube's plate circuit, so the power supply wiring (power busses) can be an inadvertent feedback path between stages. The output (plate) impedance of the diode vacuum tube rectifiers in the power supply is high, so the increasing impedance of the filter capacitors at low frequencies can mean that low frequency swings in the current drawn by output stages can cause voltage swings in the power supply voltage which feed back to earlier stages, making the system a subaudio oscillator. This is caused by inadequate power supply filtering or decoupling. The electrolytic capacitors used in equipment of 1960s vintage contained liquid electrolyte, which dried out over decades, decreasing the capacitance and increasing the leakage current, and these are often the cause.

One solution suggested is a "capacitor job", replacing all the old electrolytic capacitors. A more radical but comprehensive solution is to add modern IC voltage regulators, or replace the entire power supply with a modern regulated one.

=== In radio equipment ===
In equipment that includes radio transmitters, motorboating can be caused by radio frequency interference (RFI), the strong radio signal from the transmitter getting into audio or receiver circuits. Receiver audio circuits with automatic gain control (AGC) have a long time constant feedback loop which adjusts the gain of the audio stage to compensate for differences in audio level from causes like different speaking voices. Squelch circuits used in two-way radios to cut out noise similarly have a feedback loop which turns off the audio when high frequency noise is detected.

If the inaudible radio frequency (RF) transmitter signal is inadvertently coupled into the receiver's audio signal path, it can trigger the AGC or squelch circuit to reduce the gain. Then, after a delay time set by the circuit's time constant, the circuit increases the gain again until the amplitude of the radio signal triggers another gain reduction. This repetitive cycle is heard as motorboating.

An example might be a 27 MHz Citizen's band radio in a car, connected to the car's 12 volt DC supply. If the decoupling capacitors which bypass radio noise from the power supply wires are missing or inadequate, or the long power leads pick up excessive RF from the antenna then it is possible for the RF transmitter signal to enter the radio's receiving circuits through the supply wires. This then causes the motorboating to occur.
