= Squegging =

Phenomenon in electronic oscillators

Squegging is a radio engineering term. It is a contraction of self-quenching. A squegging or self-blocking oscillator produces an intermittent or changing output signal. Squegging is an oscillation that builds up and dies down with a much longer time constant than the fundamental frequency of the oscillation. For instance, in a radio system where the carrier frequency might be in the millions of cycles per second, squegging might occur at a frequency of hundreds or thousands of times a second.

The effect was initially seen in early radio receivers, where it would cause the output to periodically drop to zero, or alternately, create a peak that would produce a periodic "pop" sound in the headphones or loudspeaker. In the later case, it was often known as "motorboating". It was generally caused by the use of an oscillator between the amplifier stages, which had some non-linear response which would cause the amplification to rise and fall over a time period much longer than the radio frequency signal. This could generally be corrected by changing some of the components to ones with slightly different values.

The effect was later used deliberately to produce certain types of output. Armstrong's super-regenerative radio receiver is constructed such that the receiver sensitivity rises while the oscillation builds up and then stops when the operation point no longer fulfills the Barkhausen stability criterion. The oscillator recovers to the initial state and the cycle starts again, producing an output at a lower power. The result is that the steady input of radio signal turns into a series of shorter outputs at much lower frequency, producing an audible signal.

The system was also used in some early radar systems to produce the short periodic pulses of electricity that powered the transmitters. Low-power versions of this same concept was used in metal detectors and wildlife tags for many years.

== Unwanted squegging ==
In order to produce a useful output signal from the tiny received radio signal, enough signal to drive headphones for instance, early radio receivers of the past generally used some form of feedback to amplify the signal. Among the most common techniques was the regenerative receiver, which fed the amplified output of a vacuum tube back into its input, which amplified the amplification. For short, steady tones, like Morse code, this led to tremendous amplification from a single tube, which at the time were very expensive.

In order for this feedback system to be useful, the output had to be fed into an oscillator, often an LC tank. If the components in the oscillator were not carefully matched, it was possible that a non-linear effect would appear that would cause the amplification to grow so high as to overload the circuit when the signal strength increased, or alternately drop to zero when it decreased. This would cause the receiver to stop working until the signal in the oscillator naturally reset, which it would do at a rate normally defined by the capacitors in the circuit. It would then start working again, often only to have the process repeat, causing the receiver to drop out at regular intervals.

Poor layout or poor shielding leads to high-frequency oscillations where the output has been coupled back to the input, especially if the input and output cables are run together for a distance. The high-frequency oscillations cause heavy currents in the output stages and, with poor power supply decoupling, these upset the input stage biasing and disrupt the high frequency oscillations. Squegging then arises. A series resistor or a ferrite bead close to the gate or base connector of the active element reduces high frequency oscillations.

As the art of receiver design improved, squegging became less common as designers had a better idea of the sorts of oscillator setups that would avoid this effect. Moreover, the introduction of the superheterodyne receiver and the emergence of voice transmissions on AM radio lessened its effect as these systems did not use as much feedback in any single stage, and later introductions of active control like automatic gain control generally eliminated it. Armstrong's own receiver used this effect as a control system.

Squegging in audio amplifiers is commonly called motorboating because it sounds in the loudspeaker like an outboard boat motor at low speed.

== Deliberate squegging ==
The effect was well known from the 1920s through the 1950s, and became a way to deliberately produce periodic output. This was especially useful in early radar systems.

Radar (normally) works by sending out short pulses of radio signal of very high power, which required power supplies that could generate such pulses of electricity, and tubes capable of working with such pulses. This was often expensive, requiring several triodes. For systems that required less power, like the smaller radars mounted in aircraft, deliberate squegging of the carrier frequency was used to generate these pulses from a much simpler circuit. In this case one sometimes sees the term "to squegg" describing this process.

Later in the war the pulse width modulation concept was introduced, originally using cavity magnetrons, but later adapted to conventional very high frequency radios as well. These systems also generate short pulses of signal, and like radar, some of these were accomplished using squegging. It remained in use for low-cost transmitters in devices like metal detectors and animal trackers where a periodic output is needed at fairly low power levels.

== Patents ==
- US 3782730, Horchler, Stephen A., "Golf Ball", published Dec. 2, 1971, issued Jan. 1, 1974
- US 1424065, Armstrong, E. H., "Signalling system", published June 27, 1921, issued July 25, 1922

== See also ==
- AI Mk. IV radar
