= Superregenerative receiver =

Type of radio receiver

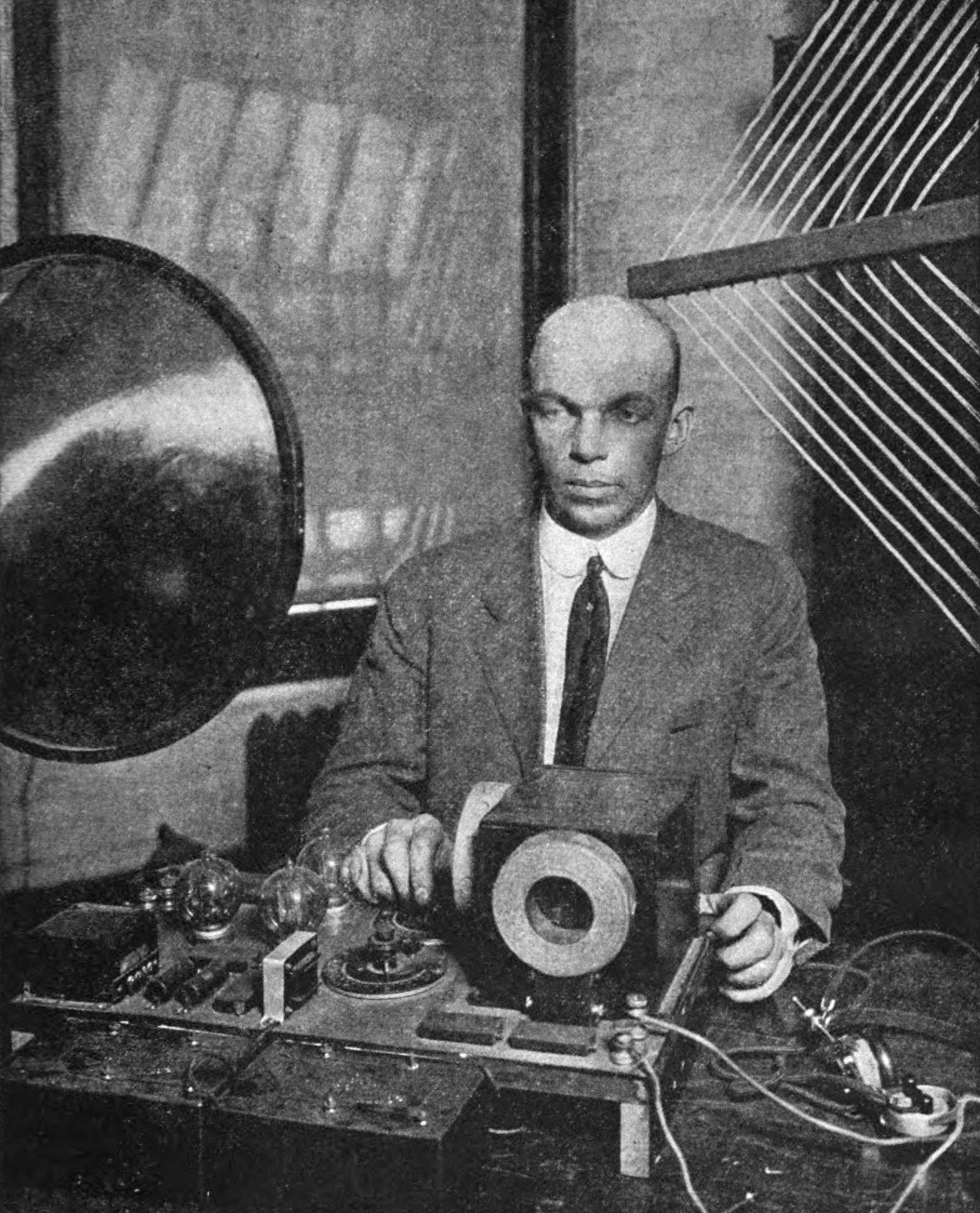
Edwin Armstrong presenting the superregenerative receiver at the June 28, 1922 meeting of the Radio Club of America in Havemeyer Hall, Columbia University, New York. His prototype 3-tube receiver was as sensitive as conventional receivers with 9 tubes.

A superregenerative receiver is a radio receiver that achieves high sensitivity by alternately allowing a resonant circuit (Note: Resonance in a circuit context refers to a state where capacitive and inductive reactances are equal and thus cancel each other out.) to oscillate and then suppressing the oscillation. Edwin Armstrong patented the technique in 1922 as an extension of the regenerative receiver. In each cycle, the amplification of a weak received signal grows rapidly and then decays when the gain of the circuitry is reduced. This can yield high sensitivity from simple, low-power circuitry.

By the 1930s the technique was understood well enough for practical use and was used widely during the Second World War. Superregenerative receivers formed the receiving element in identification friend or foe (IFF) systems used to identify friendly aircraft and ships, and in beacon systems such as Rebecca–Eureka that helped aircraft locate ground positions. Large wartime production showed that superregenerative receiver designs could be made stable and reproducible despite earlier concerns about reliability.

After the war, designers adopted superregenerative circuits for low-cost and battery-powered applications including hobby radio control systems, garage door openers, and wireless doorbells. Although more complex radio receiver designs later dominated communication systems, superregenerative techniques continued to be studied and used in specialized short-range applications, including updated theoretical analyses and millimeter-wave implementations.

== History ==
=== Origin and early development ===
The superregenerative receiver was patented in 1922 by Edwin Armstrong as an extension of the regenerative receiver. In that paper, Armstrong described a method in which a regenerative detector was periodically driven into and out of oscillation by a quench signal operating at a much lower frequency than the received radio signal. This produced repeated cycles of oscillation growth and decay. Because the amplification exceeded what had previously been considered the theoretical limit of regenerative amplification, Armstrong referred to the process as "super-regeneration".

In his 1943 Edison Medal address, Armstrong later described the effect as arising from an unexpected observation during experimental work. At the time, regenerative receivers using a single tube typically provided gains on the order of a thousand, while more advanced receivers such as the superheterodyne achieved several thousand through multiple stages. In contrast, Armstrong reported observing gains as much as 100,000 in a single stage, which was not anticipated. He noted that the underlying principle was only understood after the phenomenon had been reproduced and studied, and later remarked that "a little work brought to light a principle quite beyond the bounds of one's wildest dreams".

In 1922 Armstrong sold the rights for the superregenerative circuit to the Radio Corporation of America (RCA) for $200,000 in cash and 60,000 shares of RCA stock. This yielded more income than his earlier inventions. Lessing describes the price paid by RCA as reflecting expectations that the technique would have wide commercial use. In practice, superregenerative receivers proved poorly suited to broadcast reception as radio broadcasting evolved and stations became more closely spaced in frequency, since the technique lacked the selectivity needed to separate nearby signals. More selective receiver designs, notably the superheterodyne, were better suited to these conditions. RCA had initially placed high hopes for superregeneration, but David Sarnoff, then a vice president of the company, supported development of the superheterodyne. It later solved RCA's reception problem.

Further theoretical analysis appeared during the 1930s. In 1938, F. W. Frink published a detailed treatment in the Proceedings of the IRE that described the difference between linear and logarithmic modes of operation and compared analytical results with laboratory measurements.

Superregenerative and regenerative techniques were also explored for portable radio use. A 1936 article in Wireless Engineer described a 20-pound portable duplex radiotelephone using superregenerative circuitry that functioned as both a receiver and a transmitter. The system reportedly operated in full duplex over short ranges, meaning that it transmitted and received at the same time. Oscillators at each end were synchronized in quench timing. When one unit was receiving, the other was transmitting. The two then exchanged roles at the quench rate.

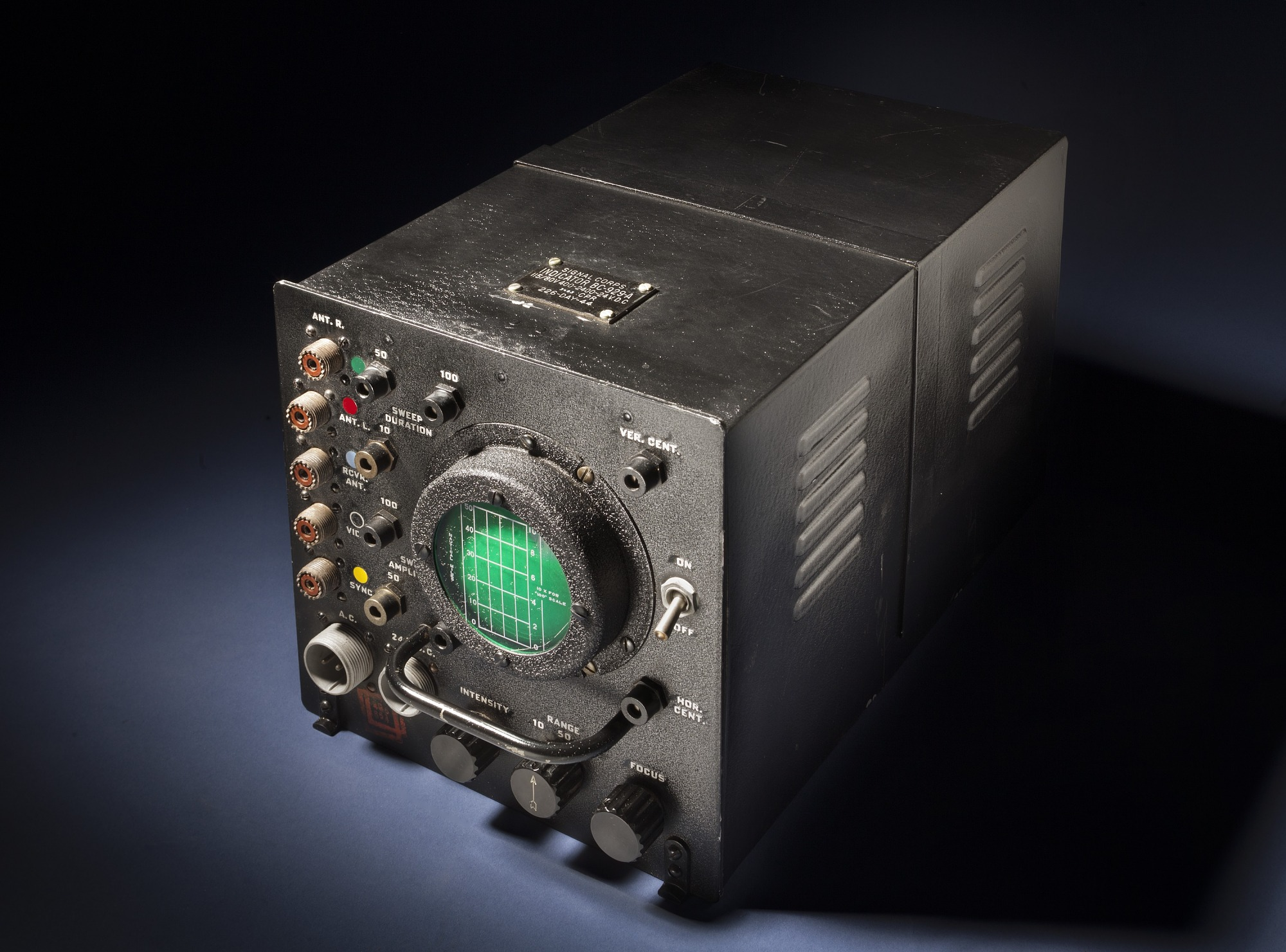
An example of a World War II airborne component of the Rebecca–Eureka beacon system. Devices like this were used in the Normandy invasion.

=== Wartime applications ===
Superregenerative receivers were used extensively during the Second World War, particularly in identification friend or foe (IFF) systems. They were employed in IFF Mark III airborne systems used by Allied forces. More than 200,000 such units were produced in the United Kingdom and the United States, with gain variation across units reportedly within 5 Decibels (dB) above or below reference values over a 30 Megahertz (MHz) band.

Superregenerative receivers formed the "Eureka" portion of the Rebecca–Eureka radar navigation system. In this and related systems, a ground beacon responded to radar interrogation pulses with an active radio reply, allowing aircraft to locate the Eureka transmitter on the ground. These systems assisted aircraft operations during the Second World War.

Large wartime production showed that superregenerative receivers could be made stable and reproducible, addressing earlier concerns about inconsistency.

=== Postwar consumer and hobby use ===
After the war, superregenerative receivers became widely used in low-cost consumer and hobby applications. A June 1947 issue of Electronics magazine described a single-tube superregenerative receiver using a thyratron for hobby radio-control systems. Raytheon also published a circuit design combining a tube and a transistor. The simplicity and high sensitivity of the design made the receiver well-suited for inexpensive remote-control equipment.

Superregenerative receivers were later adopted in short-range consumer devices such as garage door openers, wireless doorbells, and radio-controlled toys. Their low component count, low power consumption, and sufficient performance for simple short-range radio links contributed to their use in these products.

=== Amateur construction and experimentation ===
Superregenerative receivers attracted amateur radio hobbyists because they required few components to achieve high sensitivity. Early examples appeared in amateur literature during the 1930s, such as a simple design for the 56 MHz band published in QST. These designs showed that a complete very-high-frequency receiver could be built with a single active device and minimal supporting circuitry.

Amateur publications continued to explore both vacuum-tube and solid-state implementations in later decades. Articles in QEX described updated circuits for very high frequency (VHF) and ultra high frequency (UHF) experimentation. These later designs emphasized low power use and suitability for battery-operated equipment.

=== Postwar theoretical and analytical development ===
In 1946, Wireless World reassessed the main criticisms of superregenerative receivers and clarified the distinction between linear and logarithmic modes of operation. In logarithmic mode, oscillations reach their maximum amplitude during each quench cycle, producing very high amplification but also distortion and automatic gain effects. In linear mode, oscillations are quenched before full build-up, producing output proportional to the input and making the technique suitable for pulse detection applications such as IFF. The article also described the use of contemporary multi-grid vacuum tubes, including octodes (Note: This refers to a type of vacuum tube with eight electrodes. The implication of eight – "oct" – electrodes counts the control grids within the vacuum tube in addition to anode and cathode.), to combine quench and radio-frequency functions within a single device.

In 1949, Herbert A. Glucksmann published an analysis of the linear mode in the Proceedings of the IRE, mathematically modeling the superregenerative receiver as a tuned circuit with periodically varying damping. His work examined frequency response and contributed to a more formal theoretical framework.

In 1950, J. R. Whitehead published a comprehensive book devoted entirely to superregenerative receivers, summarizing both theoretical developments and wartime engineering practice.

=== Ongoing research and modern applications ===
Superregenerative techniques have continued to be studied into the 21st century. Recent IEEE publications have examined both modern linear-mode implementations and operation at millimeter-wave frequencies, including work investigating superregenerative reception at 100 Gigahertz (GHz).

Unintended emissions from superregenerative receivers have also been studied as identifiable device signatures. A 2013 paper in the IEEE Transactions on Instrumentation and Measurement showed detection of superregenerative receivers used in devices such as garage door openers and wireless doorbells by analyzing statistical properties of their emissions.

== Principles of operation ==
The evolution of Armstrong's design from the Armstrong oscillator to the super-regenerative receiver by varying amplifier gain.

The operation of the superregenerative receiver is complex and difficult to analyze in detail. As noted by Thomas H. Lee, it "has never been understood by more than a handful of people at a given time."

A superregenerative receiver operates by repeatedly increasing and reducing the gain applied to a tuned circuit. When the gain increases, even a very small signal builds up rapidly as the circuit begins to oscillate. When the gain decreases, the oscillation dies away. This repeating cycle of signal build-up and decay allows very weak signals to be detected.

Armstrong started with an Armstrong oscillator. In this circuit, the voltage of a tuned circuit (L1 and C) is amplified, and a small amount of the amplifier output is fed back to the tuned circuit through L2. If the circuit amplification is sufficient, the system is unstable and the signal will increase with each cycle, growing exponentially until the limits of the power supply are reached. When used as an oscillator, the circuit maintains signal generation at this level.

Armstrong derived the superregenerative circuit from this oscillator. The circuit achieves high sensitivity by alternating between a gain high enough to sustain oscillation and a lower gain that suppresses it. This alternation is called the quench cycle. During the high amplification phase, signals from the antenna are coupled into the circuit through L3. The feedback causes the signal to grow exponentially, as in the oscillator above. Then the gain of the circuit is reduced, rapidly suppressing (quenching) the oscillation.

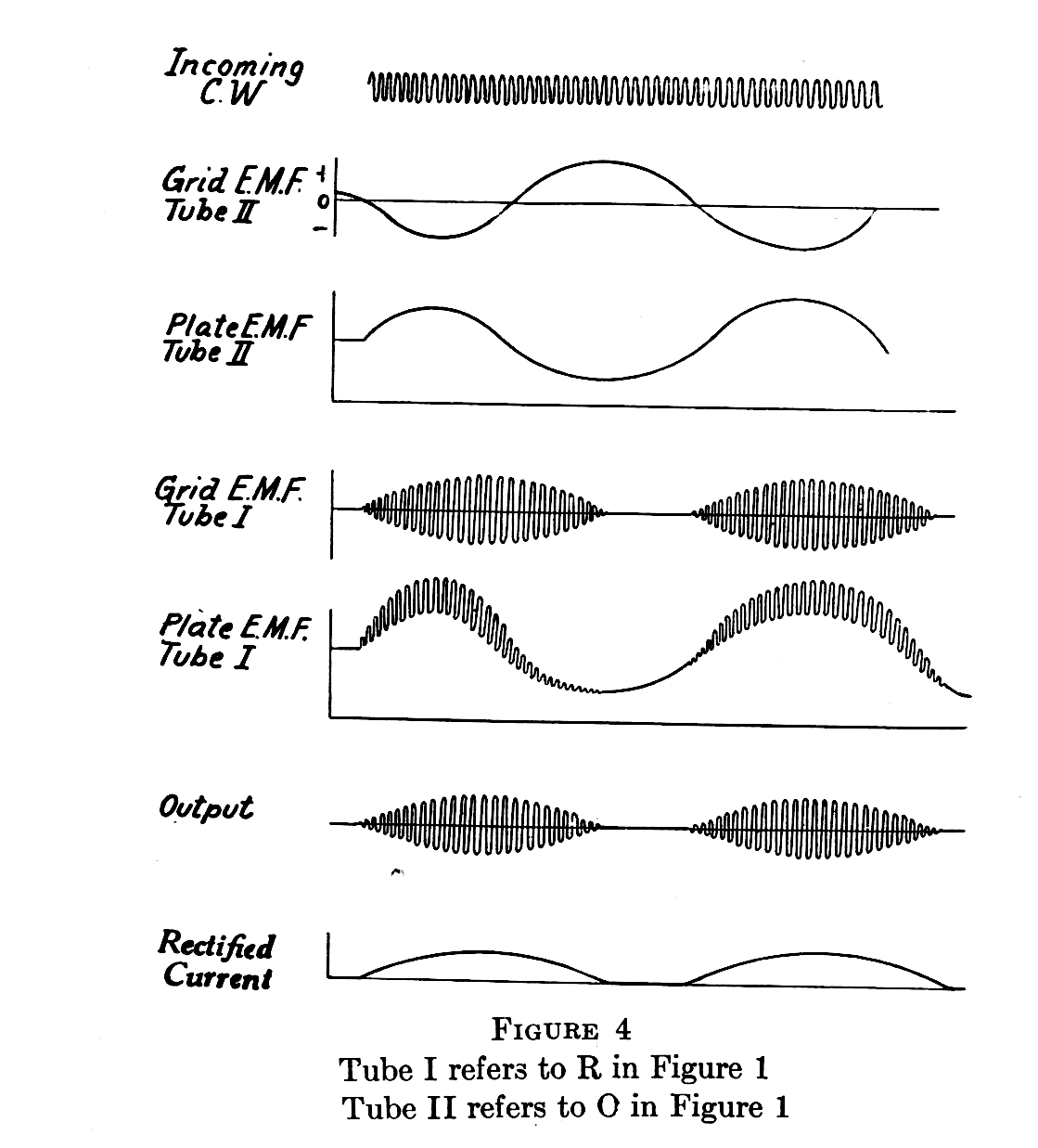
Quench and various signal operations from Armstrong's 1922 paper. The "R" tube is the receiving tube. The "O" tube is the quench oscillator.

During the period when the circuit is oscillating, any signal on the input grows by a small percentage on each cycle. For example, if the signal grows by only 1% per cycle, then after 1400 cycles the signal has been amplified by $1.01 ^ {1400}$, or more than $10^6$ (120 dB). If the received signal is at 100 MHz, this amplification takes place in 14 microseconds.

Eventually, the oscillation grows until it exceeds the input signal, after which the response becomes largely independent of that input. The growth then proceeds until it is limited by the circuit or terminated by the quench. The circuit is then quenched (reset), and the amplification and quench cycle repeats, typically around 30 kilohertz. This repeated process of growth and quenching was termed "super-regeneration" by Armstrong to distinguish it from ordinary regenerative amplification.

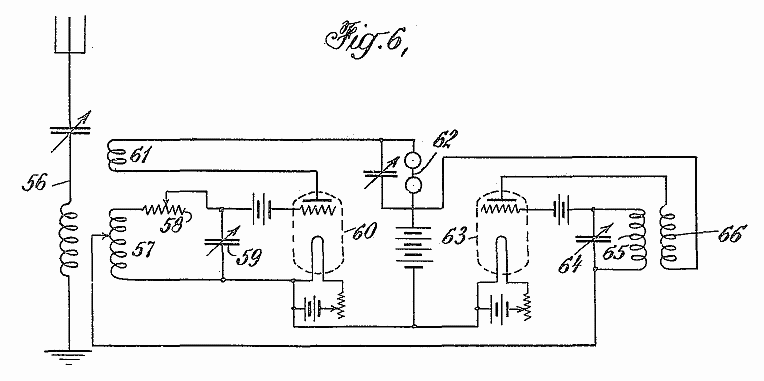
A circuit schematic of Armstrong's superregenerative receiver from his 1922 patent filing.

Armstrong's 1922 patent included a circuit schematic of such a system (figure 6):

- Vacuum tube 60 is the superregenerative detector.
- Vacuum tube 63 is the oscillator that generates the quench signal.
- Components 57, 58, 59, and 61 are used for input tuning
- Components 64, 65, and 66 set the quench frequency.

=== Effective negative resistance ===
As noted by Hulburt in 1923, the term "negative resistance" does not necessarily give a clear picture of how the circuit works, although its general meaning is "unquestionably correct". In practice, it refers to a condition in which the circuit supplies energy rather than dissipating it.

When an amplifier is connected to a resonant circuit with positive feedback, it can supply energy to the circuit at the resonant frequency. A conventional (positive) resistance removes energy from a circuit, causing oscillations to decay. In contrast, this effective negative resistance adds energy, allowing oscillations to grow. A detailed analysis of the conditions for oscillation for vacuum tube systems is given in several engineering texts and in Hazeltine's journal article on the subject.

In superregenerative receivers, this balance between energy gain and loss is controlled by varying the gain of the active device during the quench cycle.

=== Modes of operation ===
This produces two main modes of operation. How the receiver behaves depends largely on how long the circuit stays in the unstable region during each quench cycle. Oscillations can grow exponentially only until their amplitude reaches limits set by the circuit and available voltages. If the growth part of the quench cycle ends before this maximum amplitude is reached, the receiver operates in linear mode. If the oscillation reaches the maximum amplitude during each cycle, the receiver operates in logarithmic mode.

==== Linear mode ====
In linear mode, the circuit is returned to the stable region before oscillation reaches its maximum amplitude. The amplitude of the peak oscillation still roughly tracks the strength of the input signal. To maintain this approximately proportional circuit behavior, techniques to automatically control signal growth in a stable manner are generally required to prevent the circuit from drifting into limiting behavior. (Note: "Limiting behavior" refers to the way that circuits behave as they approach physical limits. The limiting behavior of circuits is often different from their behavior when they do not approach those physical limits.)

==== Logarithmic (nonlinear) mode ====
If the circuit remains in the unstable region long enough for oscillation to reach its steady-state maximum amplitude during each cycle, the output depends primarily on the time required for oscillation to reach its maximum level. This produces an approximately logarithmic relationship between input and output signal strength and allows the system to handle a large range of signal strengths.

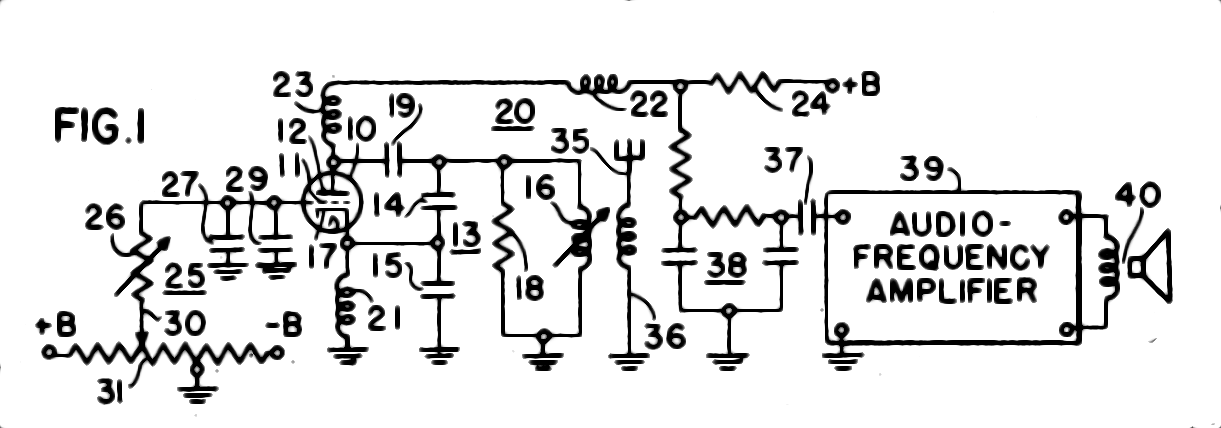
Circuit of a self-quenching super-regenerative receiver. From US patent 2,644,080.

=== Self-quenching (single-device) operation ===
"Self-quenching" devices are those which create their own quench signal without the need for external generation of the signal. In this version, two resonant circuits operating at different frequencies allow a single active device, either a vacuum tube or transistor, to perform both signal detection and generation of the quench signal, eliminating the need for a separate quench oscillator.

US patent 2,644,080 shows this sort of device (figure 1):

- Capacitors 14 and 15, inductor 16, and vacuum tube 17 form a Colpitts oscillator at the received radio frequency (RF).
- Inductor 22 together with capacitor 19 form a second resonant circuit that operates at a much lower frequency (the quench frequency).
- These two resonant systems work together so that the circuit alternates between oscillation and damping without a separate quenching part of the circuit.

This usually makes the receiver operate in logarithmic mode, since the oscillation reaches its maximum amplitude during each cycle. This dual use of a single device is similar in concept to the reflex receiver, where one active element performs multiple functions.

== Later analytical interpretations ==
=== Time-varying system analysis ===
Most circuit analysis assumes a linear time-invariant (LTI) system. (Note: LTI systems are those which can be modeled as linear and not varying over time.) The superregenerative receiver does not behave that way. The quench action periodically changes the gain around the feedback path, so the circuit’s behavior changes over time. Earlier analysis struggled with this. More recent treatments model it as a linear time-varying (LTV) system, (Note: LTV systems are those which can be modeled as linear but vary over time.) which directly captures oscillation build-up, bandwidth, and frequency response – though at the cost of more complex analysis.

=== Sub-sampling ===
The periodic quench causes the receiver to sample (capture) the input signal at regular intervals, with each quench cycle capturing the signal level before oscillation builds up and is suppressed. In The Design and Implementation of Low-Power CMOS Radio Receivers, Shaeffer and Lee describe the superregenerative receiver as the "first sub-sampled radio architecture".

=== Intended and unintended emissions ===
Because the circuit periodically enters a state in which it oscillates and the oscillator is coupled to the antenna, unintended emissions can occur during periods of signal amplification growth. These emissions can interfere with other receivers. This has influenced circuit design, including shielding and regulatory factors. In IFF implementations, controlled radiation was intentionally used as part of the design.

=== Chaotic behavior ===
Whitehead noted that oscillations from one quench cycle must decay before the next begins. Otherwise later cycles could build upon oscillations left over from previous cycles rather than on the input signal.

Later studies have looked at circumstances where superregenerative detectors exhibit chaotic behavior under certain gain conditions and ratios of quench frequency to radio frequency, wherein the prior cycle does not completely die out.

== See also ==
- History of radio receivers
