= Audion (disambiguation) =

An Audion is a wireless signal detector device invented by Lee De Forest in 1906.

Audion may also refer to:

- Audion (album), an electronic music album by Larry Fast
- Audion (software), a media player for Apple Macintosh created by Panic
- Matthew Dear or Audion, techno music artist
- Audion receiver, a type of radio receiver that was originally designed to use the Audion signal detector
