= Blanketing =

Blanketing is a term used predominantly in the US to refer to receiver blocking, which is interference caused when a strong unwanted off-channel radio signal prevents the reception of another (wanted) transmission.

This problem is greatly reduced by even moderate-quality receivers, which have better selectivity (filtering) and dynamic range than poorly designed inexpensive or disposable ones.

== See also ==
- Blocking (radio)
- Near–far problem
