= Crosley Radio (1921–1956) =

American radio receiver manufacturer (1921–1956)

Crosley Radio Corporation
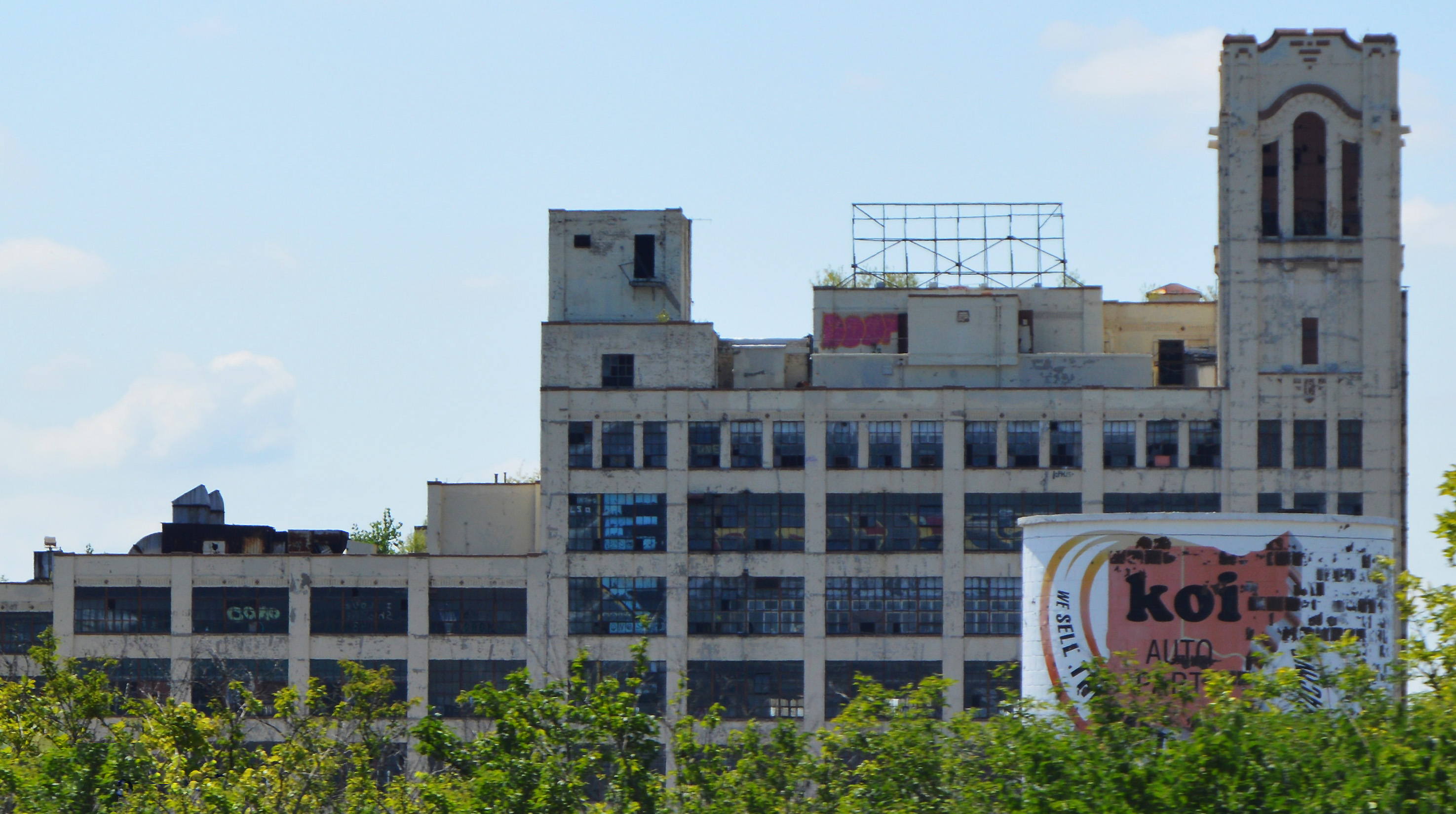
- Site of former headquarters in Cincinnati, Ohio (pictured in 2015)
- Industry: Radio manufacturing
- Founded: 1921
- Founder: Powel Crosley Jr.
- Fate: Acquired by AVCO in 1945, products discontinued in 1956
- Headquarters: Cincinnati, Ohio, United States
- Products: Radio receivers, loudspeakers, automotive radios

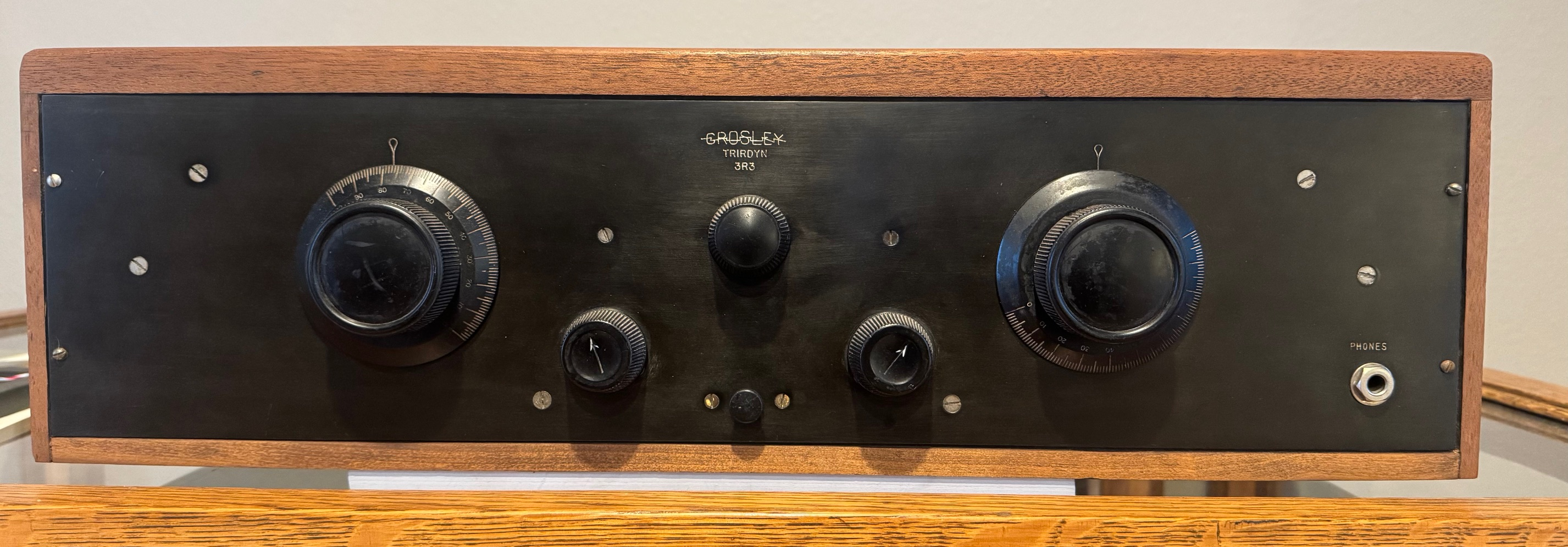
Front of the chassis of a Crosley 3R3 receiver (1924). The set used the Crosley Trirdyn circuit combining tuned RF amplification, regenerative detection, and reflex audio amplification.

The Crosley Radio Corporation (commonly known as Crosley Radio) was an American manufacturer of radio receivers based in Cincinnati, Ohio. Founded by Powel Crosley Jr., the company became one of the largest producers of radio receivers during the early years of broadcasting in the United States by emphasizing inexpensive sets intended for mass markets. Contemporary publications described Crosley as the “Henry Ford of radio” because of his strategy of producing large quantities of relatively low-cost receivers.

The company entered the radio business in 1921 and rapidly expanded its production during the early broadcasting boom. Crosley receivers ranged from simple crystal sets to multi-tube regenerative receivers. The company also operated the powerful broadcasting station WLW, which promoted radio listening and increased demand for receiving sets.

== Early development ==
Crosley began manufacturing radio receivers after discovering that available receivers were expensive, placing them beyond the reach of many potential listeners. His early products included inexpensive crystal receivers and simple vacuum-tube sets marketed as “a radio for the masses, not the classes.”

Demand for inexpensive receivers grew rapidly. By 1922 Crosley’s factories were producing hundreds of sets per day, making the company one of the fastest-growing radio manufacturers in the United States.

A significant development occurred in 1923 when Crosley acquired the Precision Equipment Company of Cincinnati, manufacturer of the ACE line of regenerative receivers. Precision held a license to manufacture regenerative circuits under patents developed by Edwin Howard Armstrong. Contemporary trade publications reported the acquisition at the time. An April 1923 notice in Radio Broadcast stated that “Powel Crosley Jr., president of the Crosley Manufacturing Company, had acquired a controlling interest in the Precision Equipment Company of Cincinnati, a firm licensed to manufacture regenerative radio receivers under the Armstrong patents.”

In January 1924 Crosley reorganized his radio operations by renaming the Precision Equipment Company as the Crosley Radio Corporation and absorbing Crosley Manufacturing into the new company. Historians note that the restructuring may have helped preserve the regenerative license, since patent licenses were often not transferable between companies. Access to licensed regenerative technology allowed Crosley to incorporate regeneration into later receiver designs, including the Trirdyn series introduced in 1924.

By the mid-1920s Crosley had become one of the largest radio manufacturers in the world. In 1925 the company was widely reported as the largest producer of radio receivers, reflecting its strategy of selling large quantities of inexpensive sets. Contemporary observers noted that while Crosley produced more receivers than most competitors, companies such as Atwater Kent often achieved higher profit margins by selling more expensive sets.

Crosley continued to expand during the mid-1920s. In 1924 he acquired a substantial interest in the De Forest Radio Corporation Ltd. of Canada, which began producing Crosley receivers including the models 50, 51, and 52, amplifiers and Trirdyn sets at its Canadian plant. The company operated under the name De Forest-Crosley and marketed its own receiver line. In December 1925 Crosley purchased the remaining assets of the American Radio and Research Corporation (Amrad) for about $39,000. The acquisition included Amrad’s manufacturing facilities and a license for the Neutrodyne receiver circuit, as well as the well-known Amrad trade name, which Crosley used for a higher-priced line of receivers.

== Receiver designs ==
Crosley produced a wide range of radio receivers during the 1920s and 1930s, ranging from simple crystal sets to complex multi-tube consoles. Notable designs included the early Harko crystal receivers, the three-tube Trirdyn sets introduced in 1924, and later superheterodyne and screen-grid receivers. The company also produced inexpensive sets such as the one-tube Crosley Pup, as well as automotive receivers and large high-power console radios.

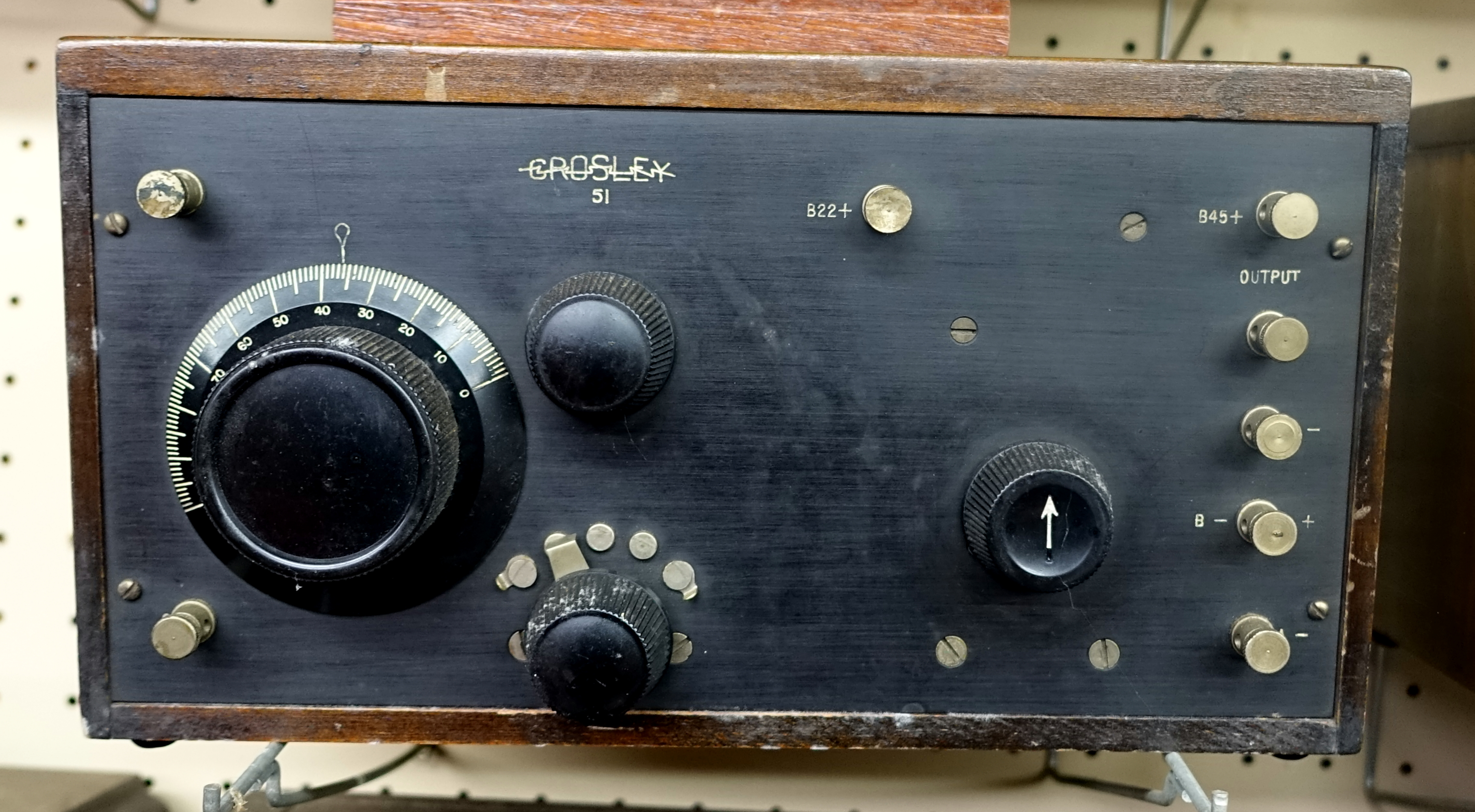
Crosley Model 51 two-tube receiver, one of the company's most popular early vacuum-tube radios.

=== Models 50, 51, and 52 ===
After the merger of Crosley Manufacturing with the Precision Equipment Company in 1923, Crosley introduced a new line of low-cost vacuum-tube receivers intended to replace earlier single-tube sets. The most successful of these was the two-tube Model 51, introduced in early 1924 and marketed as an inexpensive family receiver. Priced at about $18.50, the set was widely promoted for its performance relative to its cost and quickly became one of Crosley’s most popular products. Production of the Model 51 increased rapidly after its introduction, reportedly reaching about 500 sets per day within weeks of release.

The success of the Model 51 led to related models including the single-tube Model 50 and the three-tube Model 52. Crosley also offered add-on audio amplifiers that allowed owners to expand simpler receivers into multi-tube configurations. The Model 51 was introduced at about the same time that RCA released the Radiola III, a two-tube receiver marketed for about $35 including tubes. Crosley priced the Model 51 at about $18.50, less than half the price of the Radiola, and promoted it as a high-performing set for mass markets. Crosley's strategy emphasized high production volume and low prices. For several years the company produced more radio receivers than any other manufacturer, although competitors such as Atwater Kent were generally considered more profitable because they sold higher-priced sets.

== Trirdyn receivers ==
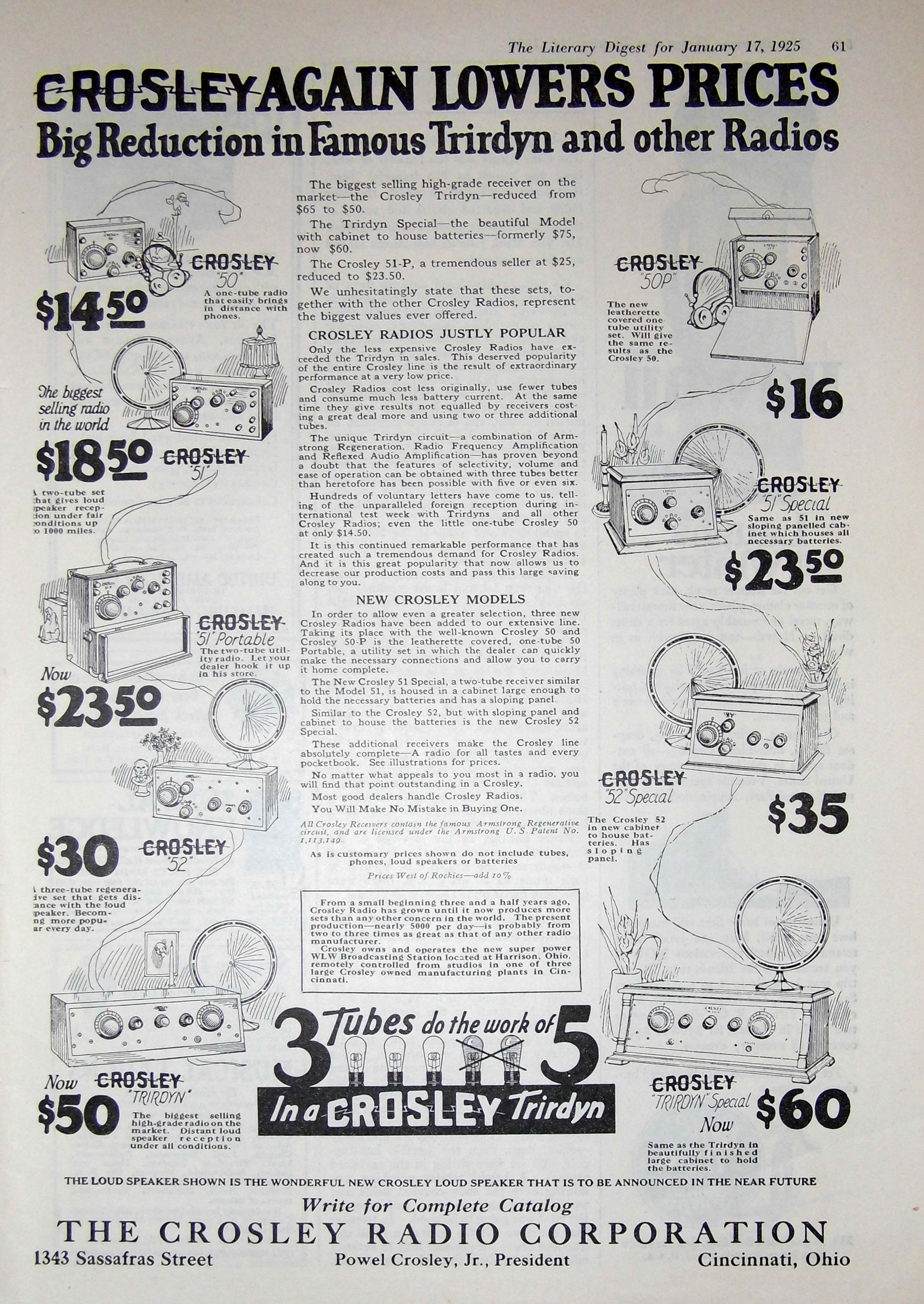
1925 Crosley ad

One of the most widely promoted Crosley receiver designs of the mid-1920s was the Trirdyn, introduced in 1924. The name referred to a circuit combining three amplification increasing techniques: tuned radio-frequency amplification, regenerative detection, and reflex audio amplification.

The Trirdyn circuit uses three vacuum tubes but delivers performance comparable to larger receivers. The first tube acts as a tuned RF amplifier, selecting and amplifying the incoming signal. The second tube serves as a regenerative detector, using positive feedback from a tickler coil to increase sensitivity and selectivity according to the regenerative principle developed by Edwin Armstrong.

After detection, the circuit routes the audio signal back through the RF amplifier stage via an audio-frequency transformer, allowing that tube to also function as an audio-frequency amplifier. This technique, known as reflex amplification, lets a single tube amplify both radio-frequency and audio-frequency signals at different points in the signal path. Series RF and AF transformers in the grid and plate circuits of the first tube separate the frequency bands and allow reuse of the same active device. The RF transformer used an air-core spider-wound coil, while the AF transformer used an iron core, providing nearly complete separation of the RF and audio bands.

The third tube provides the final audio amplification to drive headphones or a loudspeaker. At a time when vacuum-tube gain was costly in both hardware and battery power, the Trirdyn design economized by adding gain through both regenerative feedback and reflex amplification.

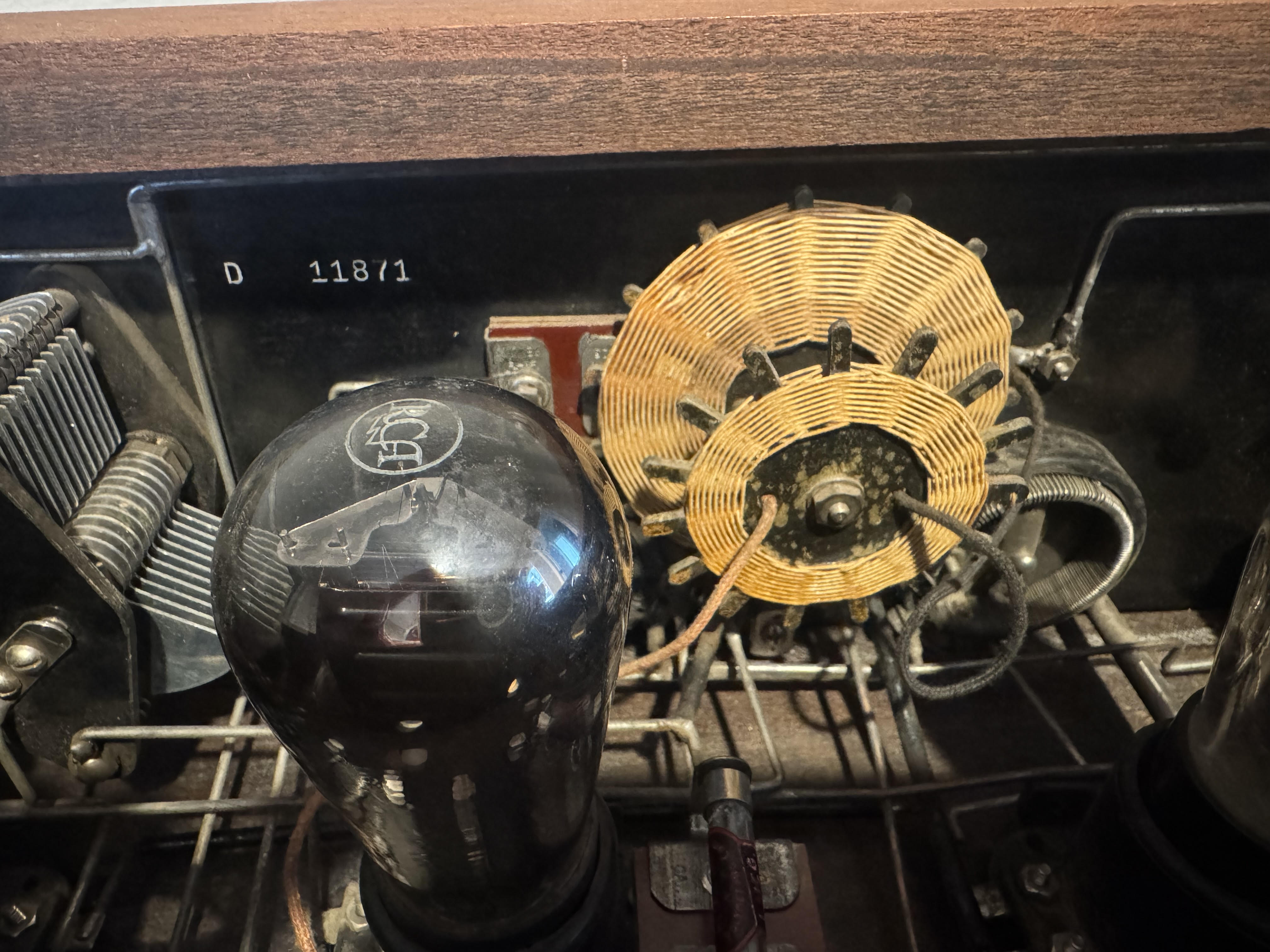
Crosley Trirdyn detector stage showing the push–pull variable inductive coupling mechanism used to control regeneration.

=== Circuit operation ===
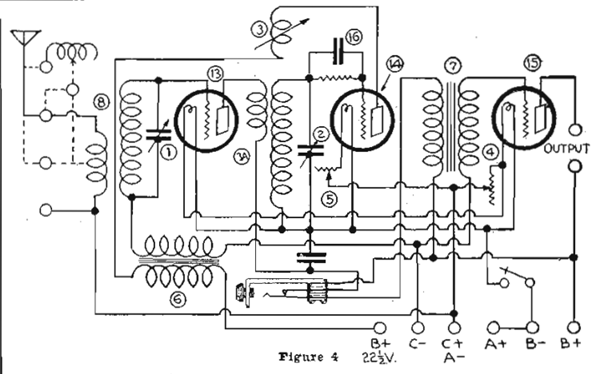
Trirdyn receiver schematic (1925) showing combined reflex amplification and regenerative detection. The antenna signal is tuned by circuit 8, amplified by triode 13 as an RF amplifier, and coupled through coil 3A to detector tube 14. Regeneration is provided by tickler coil 3, which feeds energy from the detector plate circuit back to the tuned circuit. The detected AF signal passes through transformer 6 and is amplified again by reuse of tube 13. RF and AF transformers are connected in series in both the grid and plate circuits of tube 13, separated by frequency bands. The audio is then coupled by transformer 7 to the output amplifier tube 15.

The Trirdyn circuit used three vacuum tubes arranged as a tuned RF amplifier, a regenerative detector, and a final audio amplifier. A tuned antenna circuit consisting of a variable capacitor and tapped loading coil selected the incoming signal. The first triode amplified the RF signal and coupled it to the detector stage through an RF transformer.

In an era when vacuum-tube gain was expensive in both hardware and battery power, the Trirdyn design economized by combining regenerative feedback with reflex amplification.

The detector tube operated as a grid-leak regenerative detector. A tickler coil in the plate circuit fed energy back to the tuned grid circuit, increasing gain and selectivity. Regeneration was controlled by a push–pull variable inductive coupling mechanism that adjusted the coupling between the tickler and the tuned circuit.

The detected audio signal returned through the RF amplifier stage by means of an audio transformer, allowing that tube to also function as a first audio stage through reflex amplification. A third tube provided final audio amplification for headphones or a loudspeaker.

Like most battery receivers of the early 1920s, the Trirdyn used separate A, B, and C battery supplies. The filament supply was typically about 6 V for UV-201A tubes. The detector stage commonly operated from a 22½-V B battery, while the RF and audio amplifier stages used about 90 V. A C-bias battery of about −4½ V biased the amplifier tubes. The detector used grid-leak bias.

== Advertising and popular models ==
Crosley receivers were widely advertised in radio magazines and popular publications. A 1927 advertisement in Popular Science Monthly promoted the Crosley “Bandbox” receiver, emphasizing improved reception and affordability.

Other Crosley receivers of the period included inexpensive single-tube sets such as the Pup, as well as multi-tube receivers using regenerative or tuned RF circuits.

== Later developments ==
By the late 1920s Crosley had become one of the largest radio manufacturers in the United States. The company expanded its product line to include loudspeakers, accessories, and later automotive receivers. Crosley introduced receivers using screen-grid vacuum tubes, which improved gain and stability compared with earlier triode designs. Models such as the 40-S, 41-S, 42-S, and 82-S used three type 224 screen-grid tubes as tuned radio-frequency amplifier stages. The RF stages used ganged tuning capacitors, allowing the RF amplifier stages to be tuned simultaneously with a single control. This arrangement simplified tuning compared to earlier regenerative and reflex designs.

The Crosley Building in Camp Washington was completed for the company in 1930.

In 1936 Crosley introduced the WLW Model Super-Power Radio Receiver as a response to the Zenith Stratosphere 1000Z. Named after Crosley’s powerful broadcasting station WLW, the large console receiver weighed about 475 pounds (215 kg) and measured approximately 58 inches (147 cm) tall, 42 inches (107 cm) wide, and 22 inches (56 cm) deep. The system used 37 vacuum tubes, six loudspeakers, and four electronic chassis, and was capable of approximately 75 watts of audio output power. The receiver also incorporated a built-in public address system which was advertised as capable of addressing crowds of up to 10,000 people. The number of units produced is not known.

Crosley’s manufacturing facilities were later used for wartime electronics production, including components for the VT proximity fuze, a radar-based artillery fuze developed during World War II. It also produced the SCR-694 radio set.

After the war the Crosley Radio Corporation was acquired by AVCO.

== See also ==
- Regenerative receiver
- Reflex receiver
- Neutrodyne
- WLW
