= Q multiplier =

Circuit added to a radio receiver to improve its selectivity and sensitivity

In electronics, a Q multiplier is a circuit added to a radio receiver to improve its selectivity and sensitivity. It is a regenerative amplifier adjusted to provide positive feedback within the receiver. This has the effect of narrowing the receiver's bandwidth, as if the Q factor of its tuned circuits had been increased. The Q multiplier was a common accessory in shortwave receivers of the vacuum tube era as either a factory installation or an add-on device. In use, the Q multiplier had to be adjusted to a point just short of oscillation to provide maximum sensitivity and rejection of interfering signals.

A Q multiplier could also be adjusted to act as a notch filter, useful for reducing the interfering effect of signals on frequencies near to the desired signal. In some receiver designs, the Q multiplier was made to also serve as a beat frequency oscillator by adjusting it to oscillate. This could be used for reception of single sideband or Morse radiotelegraphy, but in that case the circuit no longer provided improved selectivity.

The principle of regeneration applied to radio receivers was developed by Edwin Armstrong, who patented a regenerative receiver in 1914. At least one console-model broadcast superheterodyne receiver used positive feedback to improve selectivity in a 1926 design. Q-multipliers were common on shortwave general-coverage and communications receivers of the 1950s. With the advent of crystal and ceramic intermediate frequency filters, the Q-multiplier was no longer popular.

== See also ==
- Q meter
