= Selectivity (radio) =

Selectivity is a measure of the performance of a radio receiver to respond only to the radio signal it is tuned to (such as a radio station) and reject other signals nearby in frequency, such as another broadcast on an adjacent channel.

Selectivity is usually measured as a ratio in decibels (dB), comparing the signal strength received against that of a similar signal on another frequency. If the signal is at the adjacent channel of the selected signal, this measurement is also known as adjacent-channel rejection ratio (ACRR).

Selectivity also provides some immunity to blanketing interference.

LC circuits are often used as filters; the Q ("Quality" factor) determines the bandwidth of each LC tuned circuit in the radio. The L/C ratio, in turn, determines their Q and so their selectivity, because the rest of the circuit - the aerial or amplifier feeding the tuned circuit for example - will contain present resistance. For a series resonant circuit, the higher the inductance and the lower the capacitance, the narrower the filter bandwidth (meaning the reactance of the inductance, L, and the capacitance, C, at resonant frequency will be relatively high compared with the series source/load resistances). For a parallel resonant circuit the opposite applies; small inductances reduce the damping of external circuitry (see electronic oscillator).

There are practical limits to the increase in selectivity with changing L/C ratio:

- tuning capacitors of large values can be difficult to construct
- stray capacitance, and capacitance within the transistors or valves of associated circuitry, may become significant (and vary with time)
- the series resistance internal to the wire in the coil, may be significant (for parallel tuned circuits especially)
- large inductances imply physically large (and expensive coils) and/or thinner wire (hence worse internal resistance).

Therefore other methods may be used to increase selectivity, such as Q multiplier circuits and regenerative receivers. Superheterodyne receivers allow use one or more fixed intermediate frequency tuned circuits for selectivity. Fixed tuning eliminates the requirement that multiple tuning stages accurately match while being adjusted.

== See also ==
- "Practical RF circuit design for modern wireless systems", volume I, by Les Besser and Rowan Gilmore; chapter 3.2.6, "Receiver selectivity" (p. 113), ISBN 1-58053-521-6.
