= Reflex receiver =

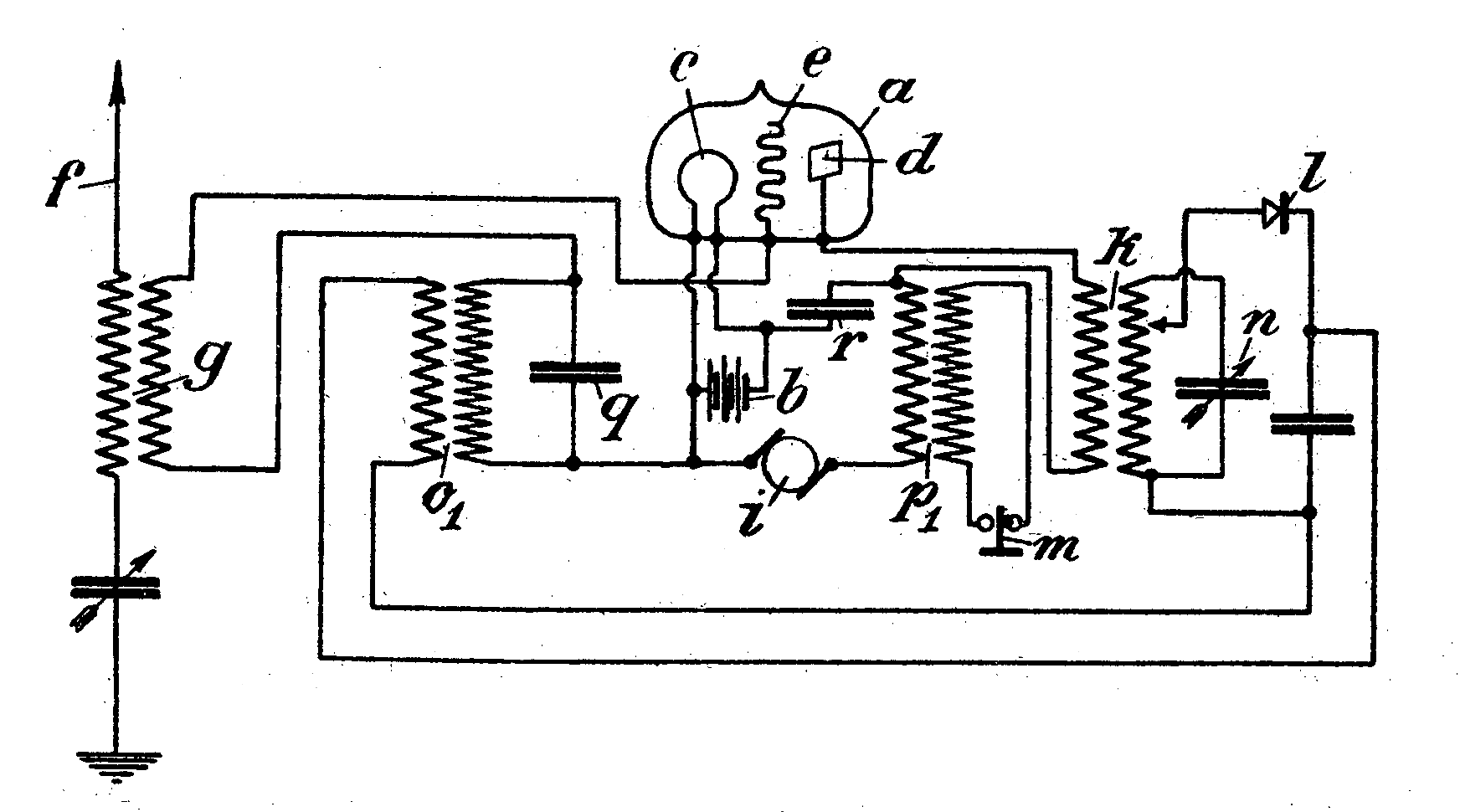
Reflex receiver from the 1914 Schloemilch and Von Bronk patent. The single triode vacuum tube amplifies the radio signal, then also amplifies the audio modulation signal extracted from it by the detector.

A reflex radio receiver, occasionally called a reflectional receiver, is a radio receiver design in which the same amplifier is used to amplify the high-frequency radio signal (RF) and low-frequency audio (sound) signal (AF). It was first disclosed in 1914 by German scientists Wilhelm Schloemilch and Otto von Bronk, and rediscovered and extended to multiple tubes in 1917 by Marius Latour and William H. Priess. In a reflex receiver, the radio signal is amplified, demodulated to recover the audio, and the audio signal is then routed back through the same active device before being applied to the earphone, loudspeaker, or more amplification. This structure reduces the number of active devices in the circuit.

Reflex receivers were popular in the 1920s because the high cost of vacuum tubes made reducing tube count attractive. As tube prices fell, receivers using more tubes became common. The technique was revisited in the 1930s when newer, smaller pentode tubes made compact receiver designs practical, and size became a primary consideration rather than tube cost alone.

== How it works ==
Block diagram of a simple single-tube reflex radio receiver

The block diagram shows the general form of a simple reflex receiver. The receiver functions as a tuned radio frequency (TRF) receiver. The radio frequency (RF) signal from the tuned circuit (bandpass filter) is amplified, then passes through the high pass filter to the demodulator, which extracts the audio frequency (AF) (modulation) signal from the carrier wave. The audio signal is added back into the input of the amplifier, and is amplified again. At the output of the amplifier the audio is separated from the RF signal by the low pass filter and is applied to the earphone. The amplifier could be a single stage or multiple stages. It can be seen that since each active device (tube or transistor) is used to amplify the signal twice, the reflex circuit is equivalent to an ordinary receiver with double the number of active devices.

The reflex receiver should not be confused with a regenerative receiver, in which the same signal is fed back from the output of the amplifier to its input. In the reflex circuit it is only the audio extracted by the demodulator which is added to the amplifier input, so there are two separate signals at different frequencies passing through the amplifier at the same time. Some receivers combined both techniques; for example the Crosley Trirdyn sets used regenerative detection together with reflex amplification.

The reason the two signals, the RF and AF currents, can pass simultaneously through the amplifier without interfering is due to the superposition principle because the amplifier is linear. Since the two signals have different frequencies, they can be separated at the output with frequency selective filters. Therefore the proper functioning of the circuit depends on the amplifier operating in the linear region of its transfer curve. If the amplifier is significantly nonlinear, intermodulation distortion will occur and the audio signal will modulate the RF signal, resulting in audio feedback which can cause a shrieking in the earphone. The presence of the audio return circuit from the amplifier output to input made the reflex circuit vulnerable to such parasitic oscillation problems.

== Applications ==
The most common application of the reflex circuit in the 1920s was in inexpensive single tube receivers, because many consumers could not afford more than one vacuum tube, and the reflex circuit got the most out of a single tube, it was equivalent to a two-tube set. During this period the demodulator was usually a carborundum point contact diode, but sometimes a vacuum tube grid-leak detector. However multitube receivers like the TRF and superheterodyne were also made with some of their amplifier stages "reflexed". Although the heyday of the reflex design in the USA ended in the late 1930s. the relexing principle continued to be applied elsewhere, particularly in Australia.

Low cost mains-powered radios that used a reflex TRF design, with only three tubes, were still being mass produced in the late 1940s. The reflex principle was used in compact superheterodyne radio receivers from the 1930s and continued into the 1950s, until at least 1959; the intermediate frequency amplifier stage was also the first audio frequency stage using a reflex arrangement. That arrangement provided similar performance, in a four-tube radio, as one with five tubes. Often, but not always, such reflex receivers did not have Automatic Gain Control (AGC), and it was usually not possible to reduce the volume completely to zero, even at the minimum volume setting. At least one type of tube, was specially designed for this kind of receiver design.

In the mid 1960's, Philips Australia, used reflexing in a television receiver. The FM sound IF signal was boosted in a 'transformerless' valve audio output stage, before being limited and further amplified in a conventional IF stage.

== Example ==
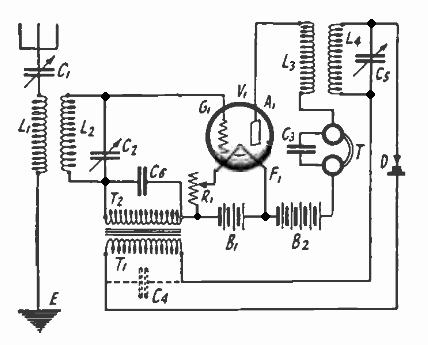
Single tube reflex AM receiver, one of the most common reflex circuits, from the early 1920s

The diagram (right) shows one of the most common single tube reflex circuits from the early 1920s. It functioned as a TRF receiver with one stage of RF and one stage of audio amplification. The radio frequency (RF) signal from the antenna passes through the bandpass filter C_{1}, L_{1}, L_{2}, C_{2} and is applied to the grid of the directly heated triode, V_{1}. The capacitor C_{6} bypasses the RF signal around the audio transformer winding T_{2} which would block it. The amplified signal from the plate of the tube is applied to the RF transformer L_{3}, L_{4} while C_{3} bypasses the RF signal around the headphone coils. The tuned secondary L_{4}, C_{5} which is tuned to the input frequency, serves as a second bandpass filter as well as blocking the audio signal in the plate circuit from getting to the detector. Its output is rectified by semiconductor diode D, which was a carborundum point contact type.

The resulting audio signal extracted by the diode from the RF signal is coupled back into the grid circuit by audio transformer T_{1}, T_{2} whose iron core serves as a choke to help prevent RF from getting back into the grid circuit and causing feedback. The capacitor C_{4} provides more protection against feedback, blocking the pulses of RF from the diode, but is usually not needed since the transformer's winding T_{1} normally has enough parasitic capacitance. The audio signal is applied to the grid of the tube and amplified. The amplified audio signal from the plate passes easily through the low inductance RF primary winding L_{3} and is applied to the earphones T. The rheostat R_{1} controlled the filament current, and in these early sets was used as a volume control.
