= Audion receiver =

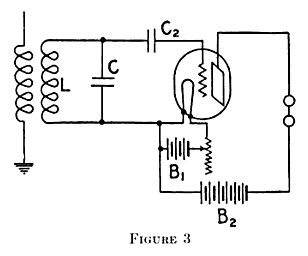
Fig. 3 Armstrong Audion receiver

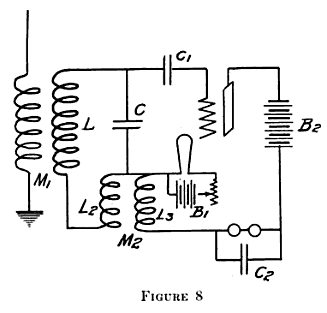
Fig. 8 Armstrong regenerative Audion receiver

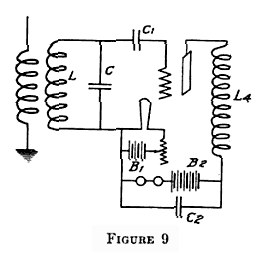
Fig. 9 Another regenerative Audion receiver

An audion receiver makes use of a single vacuum tube or transistor to detect and amplify signals. It is so called because it originally used the audion tube as the active element. Unlike a crystal detector or Fleming valve detector, the audion provided amplification of the signal as well as detection. The audion was invented by Lee De Forest.

In 1914 Edwin Armstrong described the audion receiver. In 1915 he described some regenerative audion receivers. Fig.3 shows the audion, Fig. 8 the tickler coil regenerative audion and Fig. 9 the Miller effect regenerative audion. All circuits use one tube for RF amplification, RF demodulation and audio amplification.

In its operation, the circuit demodulates the radio frequency (RF) signal by rectification or square-law detection, and then amplifies this demodulated signal. The capacitor in series with the grid forms a grid-leak detector which allow the grid to cathode to be used as a diode. A high vacuum tube needs a gridleak resistor parallel to the gridleak capacitor.

In Fig. 3, the LC circuit L and C select the receiver frequency. C2 is the gridleak capacitor and helps to demodulate the received signal. B1 is the A-battery or heater battery and B2 is the B-battery or anode battery.

In Fig. 8, L, C, B1 and B2 are as in Fig. 3. L2 and L3 have inductive coupling and implement the regenerative connection from grid to anode. C1 is the gridleak capacitor. C2 is a radio frequency bypass capacitor parallel to the speaker. Regenerative control is by changing the heater current via the rheostat next to B1.

In Fig. 9, L, C, B1 and B2 are as in Fig. 3. C1 is the gridleak capacitor. C2 is a radio frequency bypass capacitor. L4 is an inductance without inductive coupling to L. Together with the tube internal capacitor between anode and grid L4 creates a negative differential resistance at the grid. Regenerative control is as in Fig. 8.

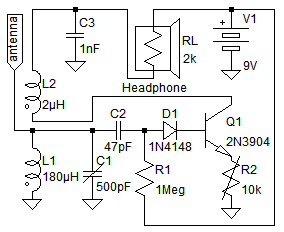
Fig. 10 AM band NPN audion receiver

In Fig. 10, the variable capacitor C1 in the LC circuit L1, C1 selects the frequency. Potentiometer R2 controls the regeneration. The tickler coil L2 has inductive coupling to L1. C2, R1, D1 and the bipolar junction transistor Q1 internal base to emitter diode are the grid-leak detector. The junction diode D1 allows a larger voltage at R1 before the two diodes conduct and clipping happens. C3 is a short circuit for radio frequency. The headphone has high impedance.

== See also ==
- Tuned radio frequency receiver
- Regenerative circuit
- Armstrong oscillator
