= Regenerative circuit =

Electronic circuit using positive feedback

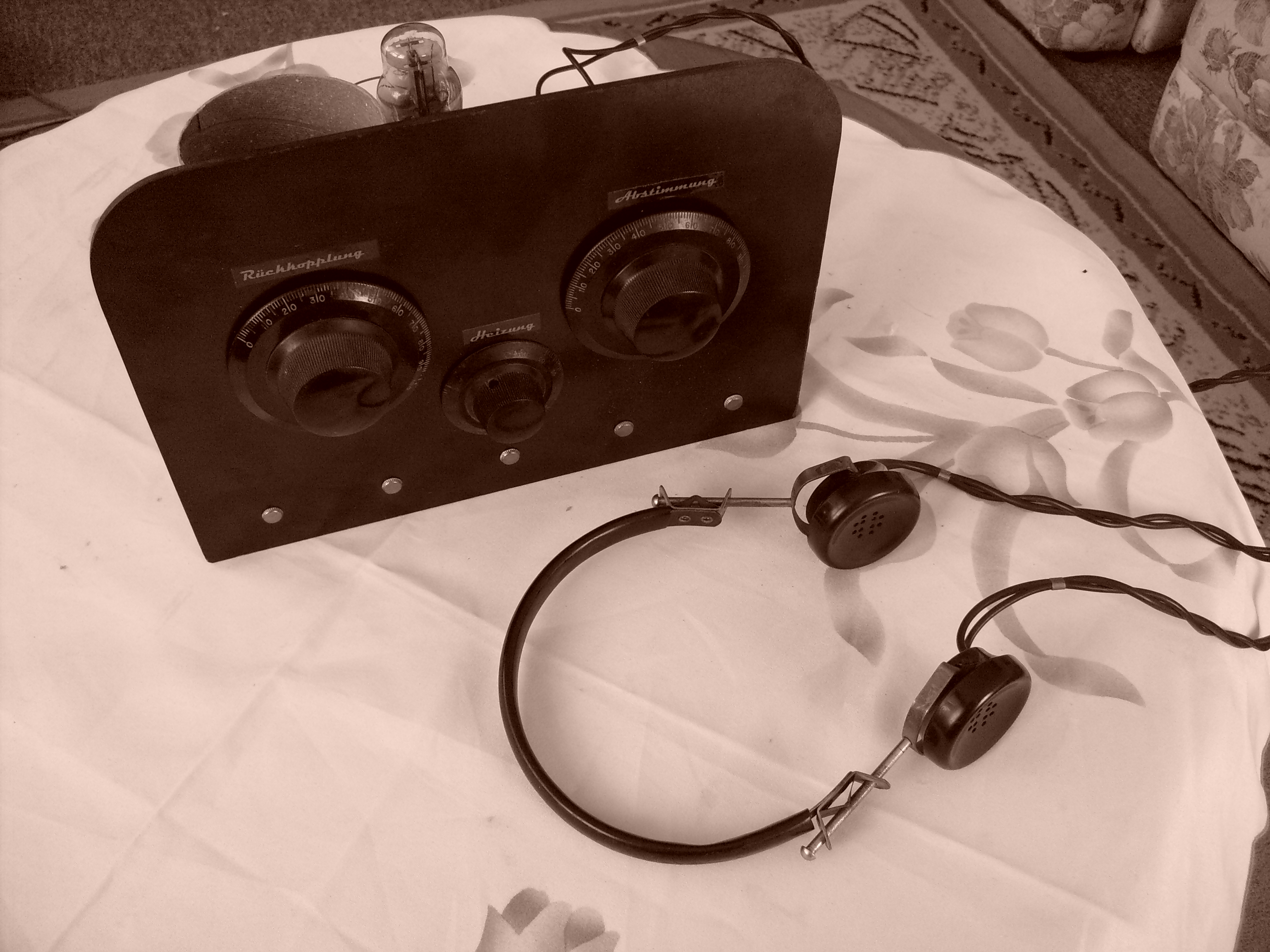
Homebuilt Armstrong one-tube regenerative shortwave radio with construction characteristic of the 1930s - 40s. The controls are (left) regeneration, (lower center) filament rheostat, (right) tuning capacitor.

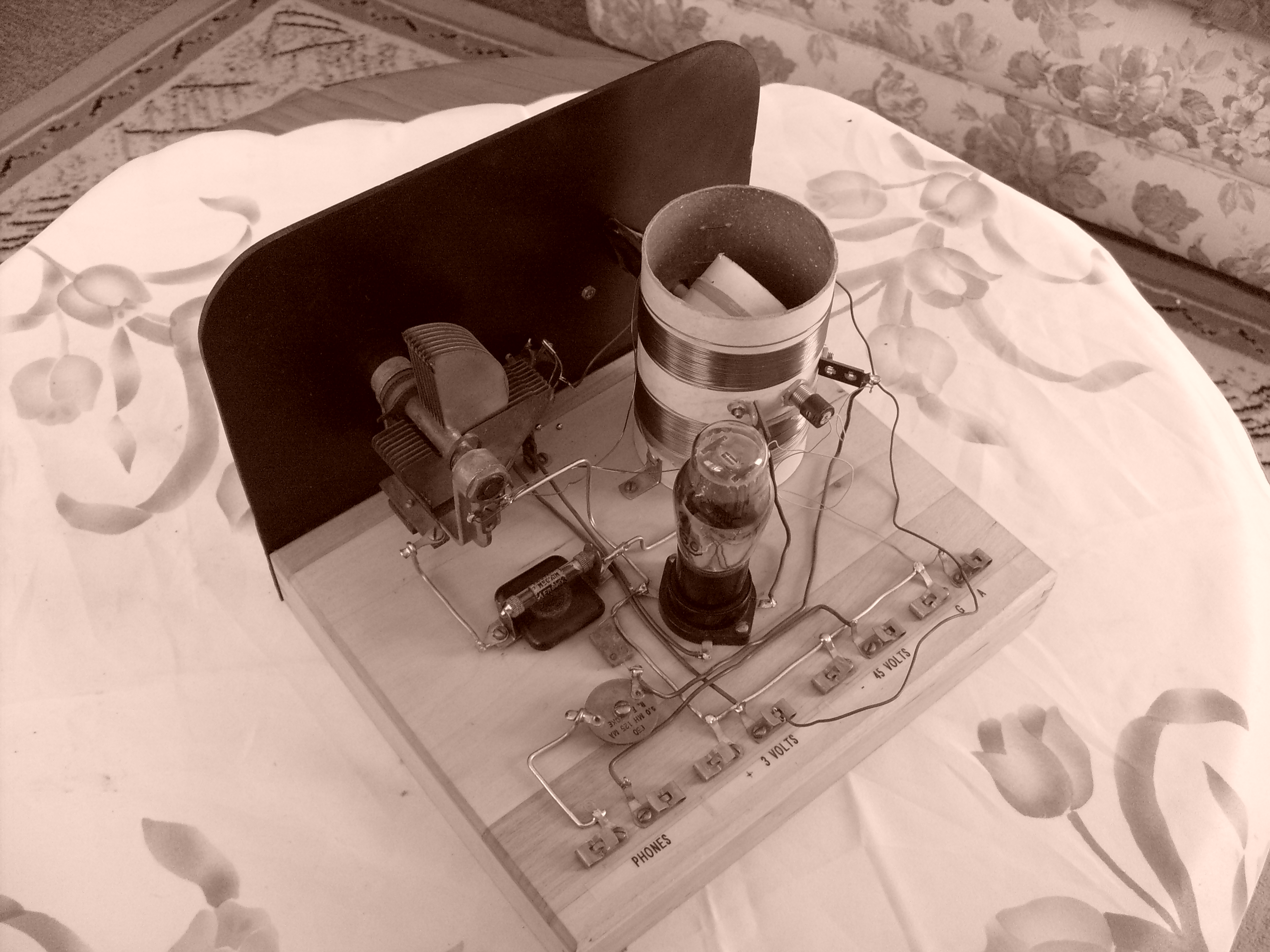
Rear view of the above radio, showing the simplicity of the regenerative design. The tickler coil is visible inside the tuning coil and is turned by a shaft from the front panel; this type of adjustable transformer was called a variocoupler.

A regenerative circuit is an amplifier circuit that employs positive feedback (also known as regeneration or reaction). Some of the output of the amplifying device is applied back to its input to add to the input signal, increasing the amplification. One example is the Schmitt trigger (which is also known as a regenerative comparator), but the most common use of the term is in RF amplifiers, and especially regenerative receivers, to greatly increase the gain of a single amplifier stage.

The regenerative receiver was invented in 1912 and patented in 1914 by American electrical engineer Edwin Armstrong when he was an undergraduate at Columbia University.

The regenerative receiver was widely used from the mid-1910s through the 1920s, with use declining during the 1930s and becoming uncommon by the early 1940s. Its principal advantage was high sensitivity with little added hardware, achieved by applying positive feedback around an RF detector stage and operating the circuit below the onset of oscillation.

Armstrong's key insight was that radio-frequency energy existed in the detector's plate circuit and could be fed back to the input, contrary to the prevailing belief that only audio frequencies remained after detection. When carefully adjusted, this feedback greatly increased the effective gain of a single active device, though operating required skill.

Regeneration improves selectivity by increasing loop gain near resonance, sharpening the frequency response without altering the intrinsic Q of the tuned circuit itself. The effect is equivalent to compensating circuit losses through feedback, simulating a negative resistance. As noted by Terman, regenerative detectors suffer from excessive selectivity, frequency-dependent critical adjustment, and a tendency toward oscillation that can produce interference and audible whistles if regeneration is increased too far. With the development of radio-frequency amplifiers designed around better tubes, regenerative detectors found relatively little application after the early 1930s.

A receiver circuit that used larger amounts of regeneration in a more complicated way to achieve even higher amplification, the superregenerative receiver, was also invented by Armstrong in 1922. It was never widely used in general commercial receivers, but due to its small parts count it was used in specialized applications. One widespread use during WWII was IFF transceivers, where single tuned circuit completed the entire electronics system. It is still used in a few specialized low data rate applications, such as garage door openers, wireless networking devices, walkie-talkies and toys.

== Regenerative receiver ==
Vacuum tube regenerative receiver schematic. Most regenerative receivers used this Armstrong circuit, in which the feedback was applied to the input (grid) of the tube with a "tickler coil" winding on the tuning inductor.

In a regenerative receiver, a portion of the detector's RF output is fed back to its input through a tuned circuit, providing frequency-selective positive feedback. When adjusted below oscillation, this feedback substantially increases sensitivity and selectivity, allowing RF amplification and detection to be implemented using a single active device.

Regeneration sharpens the receiver's frequency response by increasing loop gain near resonance. The intrinsic Q of the tuned circuit itself is unchanged; instead, feedback compensates for circuit losses, producing behavior mathematically equivalent to reducing resistive loss. As the loop gain approaches unity, the effective bandwidth narrows rapidly. Oscillation begins when losses are fully compensated.

Contemporary measurements showed that regeneration could increase detector gain by orders of magnitude. For example, a type 36 screen-grid tube with a non-regenerative detection gain of about 9 at 7.2 MHz achieved gains exceeding 7,000 under critical regeneration, with higher values possible near oscillation.

Some commercial receivers combined regeneration with other techniques. The Crosley Trirdyn receivers of 1924 used regenerative detection together with reflex amplification.

A major improvement in stability and a small improvement in available gain for reception of CW radiotelegraphy is provided by the use of a separate oscillator, known as a heterodyne oscillator or beat oscillator. Providing the oscillation separately from the detector allows the regenerative detector to be set for maximum gain and selectivity - which is always in the non-oscillating condition. Interaction between the detector and the beat oscillator can be minimized by operating the beat oscillator at half of the receiver operating frequency, using the second harmonic of the beat oscillator in the detector.

=== AM reception ===
For AM reception, the gain of the loop is adjusted so it is just below the level required for oscillation (a loop gain of just less than one). The result of this is to greatly increase the gain of the amplifier at the bandpass frequency (resonant frequency), while not increasing it at other frequencies. So the incoming radio signal is amplified by a large factor, 10^{3} - 10^{5}, increasing the receiver's sensitivity to weak signals. The high gain also has the effect of reducing the circuit's bandwidth (increasing the Q) by an equal factor, increasing the selectivity of the receiver.

=== CW reception (autodyne mode) ===
For the reception of CW radiotelegraphy (Morse code), the feedback is increased just to the point of oscillation. The tuned circuit is adjusted to provide typically 400 to 1000 Hertz difference between the receiver oscillation frequency and the desired transmitting station's signal frequency. The two frequencies beat in the nonlinear amplifier, generating heterodyne or beat frequencies. The difference frequency, typically 400 to 1000 Hertz, is in the audio range; so it is heard as a tone in the receiver's speaker whenever the station's signal is present.

Demodulation of a signal in this manner, by use of a single amplifying device as oscillator and mixer simultaneously, is known as autodyne reception. The term autodyne predates multigrid tubes and is not applied to use of tubes specifically designed for frequency conversion.

=== SSB reception ===
For the reception of single-sideband (SSB) signals, the circuit is also adjusted to oscillate as in CW reception. The tuning is adjusted until the demodulated voice is intelligible.

=== Advantages and disadvantages ===
Regenerative receivers require fewer components than other types of receiver circuit, such as the TRF and superheterodyne. The circuit's advantage was that it got much more amplification (gain) out of the expensive vacuum tubes, thus reducing the number of tubes required and therefore the cost of a receiver. Early vacuum tubes had low gain and tended to oscillate at radio frequencies (RF). TRF receivers often required 5 or 6 tubes; each stage requiring tuning and neutralization, making the receiver cumbersome, power hungry, and hard to adjust. A regenerative receiver, by contrast, could often provide adequate reception with the use of only one tube. In the 1930s the regenerative receiver was replaced by the superheterodyne circuit in commercial receivers due to the superheterodyne's superior performance and the falling cost of tubes. Since the advent of the transistor in 1946, the low cost of active devices has removed most of the advantage of the circuit. However, in recent years the regenerative circuit has seen a modest comeback in receivers for low cost digital radio applications such as garage door openers, keyless locks, RFID readers and some cell phone receivers.

A disadvantage of this receiver, especially in designs that couple the detector tuned circuit to the antenna, is that the regeneration (feedback) level must be adjusted when the receiver is tuned to a different frequency. The antenna impedance varies with frequency, changing the loading of the input tuned circuit by the antenna, requiring the regeneration to be adjusted. In addition, the Q of the detector tuned circuit components vary with frequency, requiring adjustment of the regeneration control.

A disadvantage of the single active device regenerative detector in autodyne operation is that the local oscillation causes the operating point to move significantly away from the ideal operating point, resulting in the detection gain being reduced.

Another drawback is that when the circuit is adjusted to oscillate it can radiate a signal from its antenna, so it can cause interference to other nearby receivers. Adding an RF amplifier stage between the antenna and the regenerative detector can reduce unwanted radiation, but would add expense and complexity.

Other shortcomings of regenerative receivers are the sensitive and unstable tuning. These problems have the same cause: a regenerative receiver's gain is greatest when it operates on the verge of oscillation, and in that condition, the circuit behaves chaotically. Simple regenerative receivers electrically couple the antenna to the detector tuned circuit, resulting in the electrical characteristics of the antenna influencing the resonant frequency of the detector tuned circuit. Any movement of the antenna or large objects near the antenna can change the tuning of the detector.

=== History ===
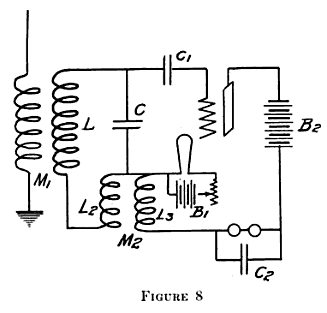
1915 Armstrong regenerative receiver

For the broader role of patents and licensing in early radio development, see

The inventor of FM radio, Edwin Armstrong, filed US patent 1113149 in 1913 about regenerative circuit while he was a junior in college. He patented the superregenerative circuit in 1922, and the superheterodyne receiver in 1918.

Lee De Forest filed US patent 1170881 in 1914 that became the cause of a contentious lawsuit with Armstrong, whose patent for the regenerative circuit had been issued in 1914. The lawsuit lasted until 1934, winding its way through the appeals process and ending up at the Supreme Court. Armstrong won the first case, lost the second, stalemated at the third, and then lost the final round at the Supreme Court.

At the time the regenerative receiver was introduced, vacuum tubes were expensive and consumed much power, with the added expense and encumbrance of heavy batteries. So this design, getting most gain out of one tube, filled the needs of the growing radio community and immediately thrived. Although the superheterodyne receiver is widely used today, the regenerative radio made the most out of very few parts.

In World War II the regenerative circuit was used in some military equipment. An example is the German field radio "Torn.E.b". Regenerative receivers needed far fewer tubes and less power consumption for nearly equivalent performance.

A related circuit, the superregenerative detector, found several highly important military uses in World War II in Friend or Foe identification equipment]. An example here is the miniature RK61 thyratron marketed in 1938, which was designed specifically to operate like a vacuum triode below its ignition voltage, allowing it to amplify analog signals as a self-quenching superregenerative detector in radio control receivers, and was the major technical development which led to the wartime development of radio-controlled weapons and the parallel development of radio controlled modelling as a hobby.

In the 1930s, the superheterodyne design began to gradually supplant the regenerative receiver, as tubes became far less expensive. In Germany the design was still used in the millions of mass-produced German "peoples receivers" (Volksempfänger) and "German small receivers" (DKE, Deutscher Kleinempfänger). Even after WWII, the regenerative design was still present in early after-war German minimal designs along the lines of the "peoples receivers" and "small receivers", dictated by lack of materials. Frequently German military tubes like the "RV12P2000" were employed in such designs. There were even superheterodyne designs, which used the regenerative receiver as a combined IF and demodulator with fixed regeneration. The superregenerative design was also present in early FM broadcast receivers around 1950. Later it was almost completely phased out of mass production, remaining only in hobby kits, and some special applications, like gate openers.

== Superregenerative receiver ==
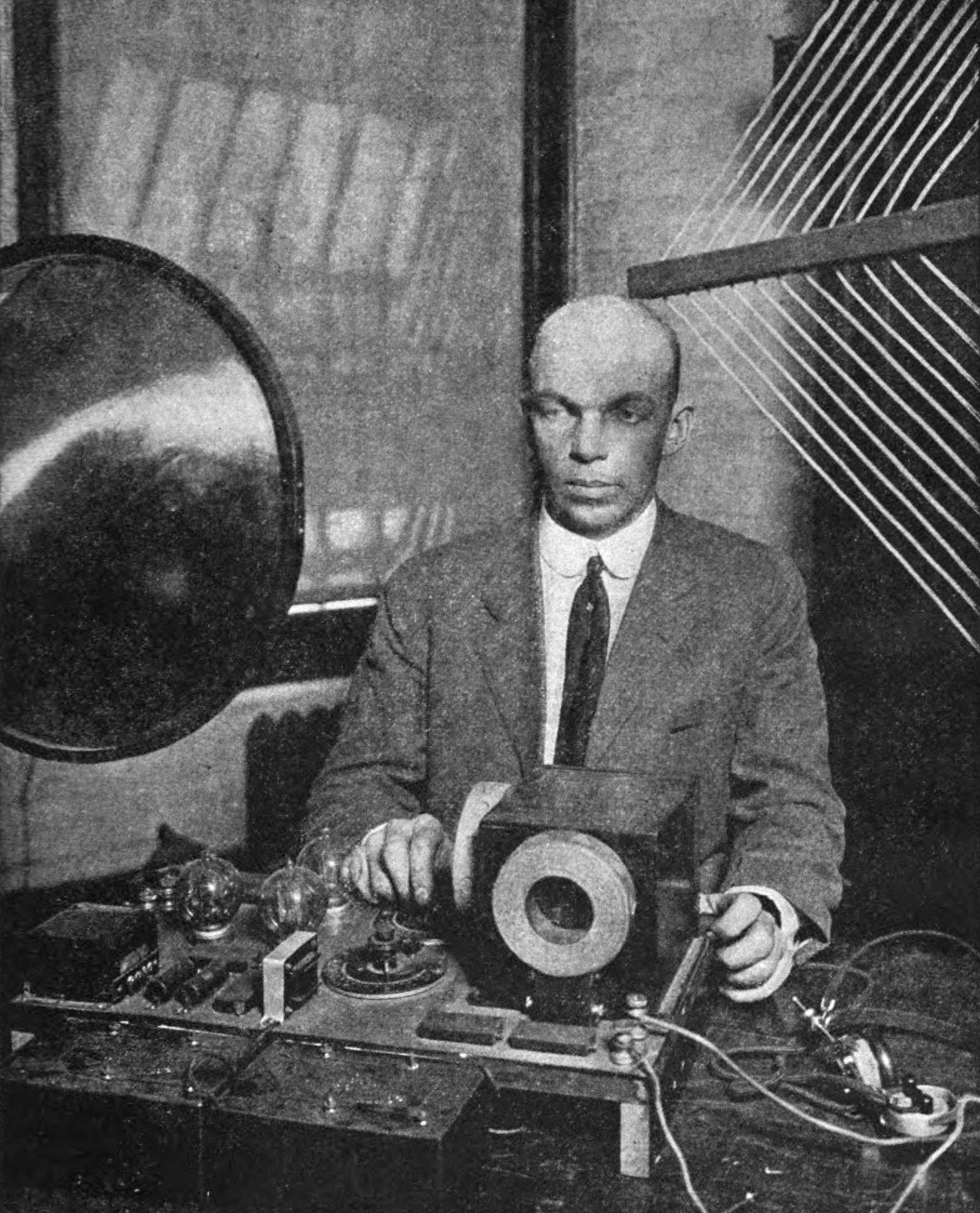
Edwin Armstrong presenting the superregenerative receiver at the June 28, 1922 meeting of the Radio Club of America in Havemeyer Hall, Columbia University, New York. His prototype 3-tube receiver was as sensitive as conventional receivers with 9 tubes.

A superregenerative receiver is a radio receiver that achieves high sensitivity by alternately allowing a resonant circuit (Note: Resonance in a circuit context refers to a state where capacitive and inductive reactances are equal and thus cancel each other out.) to oscillate and then suppressing the oscillation. Edwin Armstrong patented the technique in 1922 as an extension of the regenerative receiver. In each cycle, the amplification of a weak received signal grows rapidly and then decays when the gain of the circuitry is reduced. This can yield high sensitivity from simple, low-power circuitry.

By the 1930s the technique was understood well enough for practical use and was used widely during the Second World War. Superregenerative receivers formed the receiving element in identification friend or foe (IFF) systems used to identify friendly aircraft and ships, and in beacon systems such as Rebecca–Eureka that helped aircraft locate ground positions. Large wartime production showed that superregenerative receiver designs could be made stable and reproducible despite earlier concerns about reliability.

After the war, designers adopted superregenerative circuits for low-cost and battery-powered applications including hobby radio control systems, garage door openers, and wireless doorbells. Although more complex radio receiver designs later dominated communication systems, superregenerative techniques continued to be studied and used in specialized short-range applications, including updated theoretical analyses and millimeter-wave implementations.

== Patents ==
- US 1113149, Armstrong, E. H., "Wireless receiving system", published Oct. 6, 1914, issued Oct. 29, 1913
- US 1170881, de Forest, Lee, "Wireless receiving system", published Feb. 8, 1916, issued Mar. 12, 1914
- US 1342885, Armstrong, E. H., "Method of receiving high frequency oscillation", published February 8, 1919, issued June 8, 1920
- US 1424065, Armstrong, E. H., "Signalling system", published June 27, 1921, issued July 25, 1922
- US 2211091, Braden, R. A., "Superregenerative magnetron receiver" 1940.

== See also ==
- Audion receiver
- Tuned electrical circuit
- Q multiplier
